

426001–426100 

|-bgcolor=#E9E9E9
| 426001 ||  || — || March 4, 2011 || Mount Lemmon || Mount Lemmon Survey || — || align=right | 1.5 km || 
|-id=002 bgcolor=#d6d6d6
| 426002 ||  || — || May 16, 2010 || WISE || WISE || Tj (2.99) || align=right | 3.5 km || 
|-id=003 bgcolor=#E9E9E9
| 426003 ||  || — || November 3, 2008 || Mount Lemmon || Mount Lemmon Survey || — || align=right | 1.5 km || 
|-id=004 bgcolor=#d6d6d6
| 426004 ||  || — || April 4, 2010 || WISE || WISE || LIX || align=right | 3.4 km || 
|-id=005 bgcolor=#d6d6d6
| 426005 ||  || — || May 12, 2011 || Mount Lemmon || Mount Lemmon Survey || — || align=right | 3.6 km || 
|-id=006 bgcolor=#d6d6d6
| 426006 ||  || — || November 18, 2008 || Kitt Peak || Spacewatch || EOS || align=right | 1.8 km || 
|-id=007 bgcolor=#d6d6d6
| 426007 ||  || — || March 15, 2005 || Catalina || CSS || — || align=right | 3.1 km || 
|-id=008 bgcolor=#d6d6d6
| 426008 ||  || — || April 13, 2011 || Mount Lemmon || Mount Lemmon Survey || — || align=right | 3.5 km || 
|-id=009 bgcolor=#d6d6d6
| 426009 ||  || — || May 23, 2006 || Mount Lemmon || Mount Lemmon Survey || EOS || align=right | 1.7 km || 
|-id=010 bgcolor=#d6d6d6
| 426010 ||  || — || May 26, 2006 || Kitt Peak || Spacewatch || — || align=right | 3.2 km || 
|-id=011 bgcolor=#E9E9E9
| 426011 ||  || — || October 20, 2008 || Kitt Peak || Spacewatch || — || align=right | 2.4 km || 
|-id=012 bgcolor=#d6d6d6
| 426012 ||  || — || January 17, 2005 || Kitt Peak || Spacewatch || — || align=right | 2.3 km || 
|-id=013 bgcolor=#FA8072
| 426013 ||  || — || November 18, 2009 || Mount Lemmon || Mount Lemmon Survey || — || align=right | 1.8 km || 
|-id=014 bgcolor=#E9E9E9
| 426014 ||  || — || July 15, 2007 || Siding Spring || SSS || — || align=right | 4.0 km || 
|-id=015 bgcolor=#E9E9E9
| 426015 ||  || — || January 23, 2006 || Kitt Peak || Spacewatch || — || align=right | 2.2 km || 
|-id=016 bgcolor=#d6d6d6
| 426016 ||  || — || May 19, 2010 || WISE || WISE || — || align=right | 3.2 km || 
|-id=017 bgcolor=#d6d6d6
| 426017 ||  || — || April 30, 2010 || WISE || WISE || — || align=right | 3.4 km || 
|-id=018 bgcolor=#d6d6d6
| 426018 ||  || — || April 5, 2011 || Kitt Peak || Spacewatch || HYG || align=right | 2.7 km || 
|-id=019 bgcolor=#d6d6d6
| 426019 ||  || — || May 26, 2010 || WISE || WISE || — || align=right | 5.0 km || 
|-id=020 bgcolor=#d6d6d6
| 426020 ||  || — || June 2, 2010 || WISE || WISE || — || align=right | 4.0 km || 
|-id=021 bgcolor=#d6d6d6
| 426021 ||  || — || September 11, 2007 || Mount Lemmon || Mount Lemmon Survey || — || align=right | 2.8 km || 
|-id=022 bgcolor=#d6d6d6
| 426022 ||  || — || February 8, 1999 || Kitt Peak || Spacewatch || — || align=right | 2.9 km || 
|-id=023 bgcolor=#d6d6d6
| 426023 ||  || — || October 16, 2007 || Mount Lemmon || Mount Lemmon Survey || — || align=right | 2.9 km || 
|-id=024 bgcolor=#d6d6d6
| 426024 ||  || — || March 4, 2005 || Mount Lemmon || Mount Lemmon Survey || — || align=right | 2.9 km || 
|-id=025 bgcolor=#E9E9E9
| 426025 ||  || — || March 3, 2006 || Kitt Peak || Spacewatch || MRX || align=right data-sort-value="0.99" | 990 m || 
|-id=026 bgcolor=#d6d6d6
| 426026 ||  || — || February 1, 2010 || WISE || WISE || Tj (2.99) || align=right | 5.2 km || 
|-id=027 bgcolor=#d6d6d6
| 426027 ||  || — || March 15, 2010 || Catalina || CSS || — || align=right | 4.0 km || 
|-id=028 bgcolor=#d6d6d6
| 426028 ||  || — || January 3, 2009 || Mount Lemmon || Mount Lemmon Survey || — || align=right | 2.5 km || 
|-id=029 bgcolor=#d6d6d6
| 426029 ||  || — || February 23, 2010 || WISE || WISE || — || align=right | 6.2 km || 
|-id=030 bgcolor=#d6d6d6
| 426030 ||  || — || February 27, 2009 || Catalina || CSS || — || align=right | 3.6 km || 
|-id=031 bgcolor=#FA8072
| 426031 ||  || — || September 27, 2009 || Mount Lemmon || Mount Lemmon Survey || — || align=right data-sort-value="0.75" | 750 m || 
|-id=032 bgcolor=#E9E9E9
| 426032 ||  || — || October 12, 2007 || Mount Lemmon || Mount Lemmon Survey || — || align=right | 2.6 km || 
|-id=033 bgcolor=#d6d6d6
| 426033 ||  || — || March 14, 2004 || Kitt Peak || Spacewatch || EOS || align=right | 1.8 km || 
|-id=034 bgcolor=#E9E9E9
| 426034 ||  || — || December 29, 2008 || Kitt Peak || Spacewatch || — || align=right | 2.9 km || 
|-id=035 bgcolor=#d6d6d6
| 426035 ||  || — || March 3, 2009 || Mount Lemmon || Mount Lemmon Survey || — || align=right | 4.0 km || 
|-id=036 bgcolor=#d6d6d6
| 426036 ||  || — || October 4, 2006 || Mount Lemmon || Mount Lemmon Survey || — || align=right | 3.4 km || 
|-id=037 bgcolor=#d6d6d6
| 426037 ||  || — || February 19, 2010 || Kitt Peak || Spacewatch || — || align=right | 3.9 km || 
|-id=038 bgcolor=#d6d6d6
| 426038 ||  || — || November 20, 2006 || Kitt Peak || Spacewatch || — || align=right | 3.8 km || 
|-id=039 bgcolor=#d6d6d6
| 426039 ||  || — || November 20, 2004 || Kitt Peak || Spacewatch || 3:2 || align=right | 5.8 km || 
|-id=040 bgcolor=#fefefe
| 426040 ||  || — || April 6, 2005 || Kitt Peak || Spacewatch || H || align=right data-sort-value="0.62" | 620 m || 
|-id=041 bgcolor=#d6d6d6
| 426041 ||  || — || December 17, 2006 || Mount Lemmon || Mount Lemmon Survey || — || align=right | 3.7 km || 
|-id=042 bgcolor=#FA8072
| 426042 ||  || — || March 13, 2002 || Socorro || LINEAR || H || align=right data-sort-value="0.69" | 690 m || 
|-id=043 bgcolor=#fefefe
| 426043 ||  || — || October 21, 2011 || Kitt Peak || Spacewatch || H || align=right data-sort-value="0.58" | 580 m || 
|-id=044 bgcolor=#fefefe
| 426044 ||  || — || May 8, 2010 || Mount Lemmon || Mount Lemmon Survey || H || align=right data-sort-value="0.83" | 830 m || 
|-id=045 bgcolor=#fefefe
| 426045 ||  || — || October 17, 2003 || Anderson Mesa || LONEOS || H || align=right data-sort-value="0.92" | 920 m || 
|-id=046 bgcolor=#d6d6d6
| 426046 ||  || — || October 7, 2005 || Kitt Peak || Spacewatch || — || align=right | 2.4 km || 
|-id=047 bgcolor=#fefefe
| 426047 ||  || — || December 1, 2005 || Kitt Peak || Spacewatch || — || align=right data-sort-value="0.56" | 560 m || 
|-id=048 bgcolor=#fefefe
| 426048 ||  || — || May 16, 2010 || Catalina || CSS || H || align=right data-sort-value="0.82" | 820 m || 
|-id=049 bgcolor=#C2FFFF
| 426049 ||  || — || January 12, 2000 || Kitt Peak || Spacewatch || L4 || align=right | 9.3 km || 
|-id=050 bgcolor=#fefefe
| 426050 ||  || — || March 13, 2002 || Kitt Peak || Spacewatch || — || align=right data-sort-value="0.67" | 670 m || 
|-id=051 bgcolor=#fefefe
| 426051 ||  || — || December 25, 2011 || Kitt Peak || Spacewatch || H || align=right data-sort-value="0.84" | 840 m || 
|-id=052 bgcolor=#fefefe
| 426052 ||  || — || December 11, 2004 || Kitt Peak || Spacewatch || — || align=right data-sort-value="0.53" | 530 m || 
|-id=053 bgcolor=#fefefe
| 426053 ||  || — || January 4, 2012 || Mount Lemmon || Mount Lemmon Survey || — || align=right data-sort-value="0.98" | 980 m || 
|-id=054 bgcolor=#fefefe
| 426054 ||  || — || March 16, 2004 || Catalina || CSS || H || align=right data-sort-value="0.74" | 740 m || 
|-id=055 bgcolor=#fefefe
| 426055 ||  || — || January 13, 2005 || Kitt Peak || Spacewatch || — || align=right data-sort-value="0.81" | 810 m || 
|-id=056 bgcolor=#fefefe
| 426056 ||  || — || January 15, 2005 || Kitt Peak || Spacewatch || — || align=right data-sort-value="0.48" | 480 m || 
|-id=057 bgcolor=#FA8072
| 426057 ||  || — || August 30, 2005 || Anderson Mesa || LONEOS || — || align=right data-sort-value="0.57" | 570 m || 
|-id=058 bgcolor=#fefefe
| 426058 ||  || — || October 16, 2007 || Kitt Peak || Spacewatch || — || align=right data-sort-value="0.62" | 620 m || 
|-id=059 bgcolor=#fefefe
| 426059 ||  || — || May 3, 2005 || Kitt Peak || Spacewatch || — || align=right data-sort-value="0.94" | 940 m || 
|-id=060 bgcolor=#E9E9E9
| 426060 ||  || — || December 31, 2007 || Kitt Peak || Spacewatch || — || align=right | 1.0 km || 
|-id=061 bgcolor=#fefefe
| 426061 ||  || — || March 11, 2005 || Kitt Peak || Spacewatch || — || align=right data-sort-value="0.69" | 690 m || 
|-id=062 bgcolor=#fefefe
| 426062 ||  || — || February 7, 2002 || Kitt Peak || Spacewatch || — || align=right data-sort-value="0.55" | 550 m || 
|-id=063 bgcolor=#fefefe
| 426063 ||  || — || October 10, 2010 || Mount Lemmon || Mount Lemmon Survey || — || align=right | 1.0 km || 
|-id=064 bgcolor=#fefefe
| 426064 ||  || — || February 27, 2009 || Kitt Peak || Spacewatch || — || align=right data-sort-value="0.84" | 840 m || 
|-id=065 bgcolor=#fefefe
| 426065 ||  || — || March 29, 2009 || Kitt Peak || Spacewatch || — || align=right data-sort-value="0.54" | 540 m || 
|-id=066 bgcolor=#fefefe
| 426066 ||  || — || January 21, 2012 || Kitt Peak || Spacewatch || — || align=right data-sort-value="0.70" | 700 m || 
|-id=067 bgcolor=#fefefe
| 426067 ||  || — || March 28, 2009 || Siding Spring || SSS || — || align=right | 1.0 km || 
|-id=068 bgcolor=#fefefe
| 426068 ||  || — || January 19, 2005 || Kitt Peak || Spacewatch || — || align=right data-sort-value="0.69" | 690 m || 
|-id=069 bgcolor=#fefefe
| 426069 ||  || — || August 31, 2005 || Kitt Peak || Spacewatch || H || align=right data-sort-value="0.76" | 760 m || 
|-id=070 bgcolor=#fefefe
| 426070 ||  || — || October 13, 2007 || Kitt Peak || Spacewatch || — || align=right data-sort-value="0.52" | 520 m || 
|-id=071 bgcolor=#FFC2E0
| 426071 ||  || — || February 13, 2012 || La Sagra || OAM Obs. || APO || align=right data-sort-value="0.37" | 370 m || 
|-id=072 bgcolor=#fefefe
| 426072 ||  || — || February 2, 2012 || Kitt Peak || Spacewatch || — || align=right data-sort-value="0.70" | 700 m || 
|-id=073 bgcolor=#fefefe
| 426073 ||  || — || January 30, 2012 || Kitt Peak || Spacewatch || — || align=right data-sort-value="0.90" | 900 m || 
|-id=074 bgcolor=#fefefe
| 426074 ||  || — || March 6, 1999 || Kitt Peak || Spacewatch || — || align=right data-sort-value="0.65" | 650 m || 
|-id=075 bgcolor=#fefefe
| 426075 ||  || — || October 1, 2010 || Kitt Peak || Spacewatch || — || align=right data-sort-value="0.60" | 600 m || 
|-id=076 bgcolor=#fefefe
| 426076 ||  || — || September 17, 2010 || Kitt Peak || Spacewatch || — || align=right data-sort-value="0.63" | 630 m || 
|-id=077 bgcolor=#fefefe
| 426077 ||  || — || January 22, 1998 || Kitt Peak || Spacewatch || — || align=right data-sort-value="0.66" | 660 m || 
|-id=078 bgcolor=#fefefe
| 426078 ||  || — || November 12, 2007 || Mount Lemmon || Mount Lemmon Survey || — || align=right data-sort-value="0.69" | 690 m || 
|-id=079 bgcolor=#fefefe
| 426079 ||  || — || January 18, 2012 || Mount Lemmon || Mount Lemmon Survey || critical || align=right data-sort-value="0.59" | 590 m || 
|-id=080 bgcolor=#fefefe
| 426080 ||  || — || February 21, 2012 || Kitt Peak || Spacewatch || — || align=right data-sort-value="0.64" | 640 m || 
|-id=081 bgcolor=#fefefe
| 426081 ||  || — || October 10, 2007 || Mount Lemmon || Mount Lemmon Survey || — || align=right data-sort-value="0.64" | 640 m || 
|-id=082 bgcolor=#FFC2E0
| 426082 ||  || — || February 24, 2012 || Catalina || CSS || AMO || align=right data-sort-value="0.34" | 340 m || 
|-id=083 bgcolor=#fefefe
| 426083 ||  || — || November 14, 2007 || Kitt Peak || Spacewatch || — || align=right data-sort-value="0.66" | 660 m || 
|-id=084 bgcolor=#fefefe
| 426084 ||  || — || May 27, 2009 || Mount Lemmon || Mount Lemmon Survey || critical || align=right data-sort-value="0.57" | 570 m || 
|-id=085 bgcolor=#fefefe
| 426085 ||  || — || February 23, 2012 || Kitt Peak || Spacewatch || — || align=right data-sort-value="0.60" | 600 m || 
|-id=086 bgcolor=#fefefe
| 426086 ||  || — || September 17, 2010 || Mount Lemmon || Mount Lemmon Survey || — || align=right data-sort-value="0.63" | 630 m || 
|-id=087 bgcolor=#fefefe
| 426087 ||  || — || February 25, 2012 || Kitt Peak || Spacewatch || — || align=right data-sort-value="0.75" | 750 m || 
|-id=088 bgcolor=#E9E9E9
| 426088 ||  || — || April 4, 2008 || Kitt Peak || Spacewatch || — || align=right | 1.7 km || 
|-id=089 bgcolor=#fefefe
| 426089 ||  || — || October 7, 2007 || Kitt Peak || Spacewatch || — || align=right data-sort-value="0.81" | 810 m || 
|-id=090 bgcolor=#fefefe
| 426090 ||  || — || September 14, 2010 || Kitt Peak || Spacewatch || — || align=right data-sort-value="0.73" | 730 m || 
|-id=091 bgcolor=#fefefe
| 426091 ||  || — || October 14, 2010 || Mount Lemmon || Mount Lemmon Survey || — || align=right data-sort-value="0.92" | 920 m || 
|-id=092 bgcolor=#fefefe
| 426092 ||  || — || September 13, 2007 || Mount Lemmon || Mount Lemmon Survey || — || align=right data-sort-value="0.58" | 580 m || 
|-id=093 bgcolor=#fefefe
| 426093 ||  || — || March 4, 2005 || Mount Lemmon || Mount Lemmon Survey || — || align=right | 1.0 km || 
|-id=094 bgcolor=#fefefe
| 426094 ||  || — || December 12, 2004 || Kitt Peak || Spacewatch || — || align=right data-sort-value="0.77" | 770 m || 
|-id=095 bgcolor=#fefefe
| 426095 ||  || — || April 1, 2005 || Kitt Peak || Spacewatch || — || align=right data-sort-value="0.73" | 730 m || 
|-id=096 bgcolor=#fefefe
| 426096 ||  || — || November 8, 2007 || Kitt Peak || Spacewatch || — || align=right data-sort-value="0.74" | 740 m || 
|-id=097 bgcolor=#fefefe
| 426097 ||  || — || March 11, 2005 || Mount Lemmon || Mount Lemmon Survey || — || align=right data-sort-value="0.65" | 650 m || 
|-id=098 bgcolor=#fefefe
| 426098 ||  || — || February 9, 2005 || Kitt Peak || Spacewatch || — || align=right data-sort-value="0.97" | 970 m || 
|-id=099 bgcolor=#E9E9E9
| 426099 ||  || — || October 3, 2005 || Catalina || CSS || — || align=right | 1.5 km || 
|-id=100 bgcolor=#fefefe
| 426100 ||  || — || February 18, 2012 || Catalina || CSS || — || align=right | 1.1 km || 
|}

426101–426200 

|-bgcolor=#fefefe
| 426101 ||  || — || June 19, 2006 || Mount Lemmon || Mount Lemmon Survey || — || align=right data-sort-value="0.74" | 740 m || 
|-id=102 bgcolor=#fefefe
| 426102 ||  || — || May 28, 2009 || Mount Lemmon || Mount Lemmon Survey || — || align=right data-sort-value="0.57" | 570 m || 
|-id=103 bgcolor=#fefefe
| 426103 ||  || — || February 28, 2005 || Socorro || LINEAR || — || align=right | 1.6 km || 
|-id=104 bgcolor=#fefefe
| 426104 ||  || — || November 2, 2007 || Kitt Peak || Spacewatch || — || align=right data-sort-value="0.65" | 650 m || 
|-id=105 bgcolor=#fefefe
| 426105 ||  || — || November 14, 2007 || Kitt Peak || Spacewatch || — || align=right data-sort-value="0.67" | 670 m || 
|-id=106 bgcolor=#fefefe
| 426106 ||  || — || March 26, 2009 || Mount Lemmon || Mount Lemmon Survey || — || align=right data-sort-value="0.59" | 590 m || 
|-id=107 bgcolor=#E9E9E9
| 426107 ||  || — || October 27, 2005 || Kitt Peak || Spacewatch || — || align=right | 1.6 km || 
|-id=108 bgcolor=#fefefe
| 426108 ||  || — || March 4, 2005 || Mount Lemmon || Mount Lemmon Survey || — || align=right data-sort-value="0.62" | 620 m || 
|-id=109 bgcolor=#fefefe
| 426109 ||  || — || September 3, 2010 || Mount Lemmon || Mount Lemmon Survey || — || align=right data-sort-value="0.60" | 600 m || 
|-id=110 bgcolor=#fefefe
| 426110 ||  || — || March 15, 2012 || Kitt Peak || Spacewatch || — || align=right data-sort-value="0.82" | 820 m || 
|-id=111 bgcolor=#E9E9E9
| 426111 ||  || — || November 4, 2005 || Mount Lemmon || Mount Lemmon Survey || HOF || align=right | 2.5 km || 
|-id=112 bgcolor=#fefefe
| 426112 ||  || — || March 21, 2012 || Catalina || CSS || NYS || align=right data-sort-value="0.65" | 650 m || 
|-id=113 bgcolor=#E9E9E9
| 426113 ||  || — || February 21, 2012 || Mount Lemmon || Mount Lemmon Survey || — || align=right | 2.2 km || 
|-id=114 bgcolor=#fefefe
| 426114 ||  || — || March 10, 2005 || Mount Lemmon || Mount Lemmon Survey || — || align=right data-sort-value="0.71" | 710 m || 
|-id=115 bgcolor=#fefefe
| 426115 ||  || — || March 29, 2012 || Mount Lemmon || Mount Lemmon Survey || — || align=right data-sort-value="0.77" | 770 m || 
|-id=116 bgcolor=#fefefe
| 426116 ||  || — || March 27, 2012 || Kitt Peak || Spacewatch || — || align=right | 1.2 km || 
|-id=117 bgcolor=#E9E9E9
| 426117 ||  || — || August 28, 2005 || Kitt Peak || Spacewatch || — || align=right data-sort-value="0.94" | 940 m || 
|-id=118 bgcolor=#fefefe
| 426118 ||  || — || December 20, 2007 || Kitt Peak || Spacewatch || — || align=right data-sort-value="0.65" | 650 m || 
|-id=119 bgcolor=#fefefe
| 426119 ||  || — || March 10, 2005 || Mount Lemmon || Mount Lemmon Survey || — || align=right data-sort-value="0.80" | 800 m || 
|-id=120 bgcolor=#fefefe
| 426120 ||  || — || September 30, 2003 || Kitt Peak || Spacewatch || — || align=right data-sort-value="0.73" | 730 m || 
|-id=121 bgcolor=#fefefe
| 426121 ||  || — || September 30, 2006 || Kitt Peak || Spacewatch || — || align=right data-sort-value="0.74" | 740 m || 
|-id=122 bgcolor=#E9E9E9
| 426122 ||  || — || September 15, 2009 || Kitt Peak || Spacewatch || — || align=right | 1.7 km || 
|-id=123 bgcolor=#fefefe
| 426123 ||  || — || September 19, 2006 || Kitt Peak || Spacewatch || V || align=right data-sort-value="0.47" | 470 m || 
|-id=124 bgcolor=#E9E9E9
| 426124 ||  || — || February 23, 1998 || Kitt Peak || Spacewatch || — || align=right | 2.5 km || 
|-id=125 bgcolor=#E9E9E9
| 426125 ||  || — || September 22, 2009 || Kitt Peak || Spacewatch || — || align=right | 2.2 km || 
|-id=126 bgcolor=#E9E9E9
| 426126 ||  || — || March 27, 2012 || Catalina || CSS || — || align=right | 3.0 km || 
|-id=127 bgcolor=#fefefe
| 426127 ||  || — || October 14, 2007 || Mount Lemmon || Mount Lemmon Survey || — || align=right data-sort-value="0.80" | 800 m || 
|-id=128 bgcolor=#fefefe
| 426128 ||  || — || November 3, 2007 || Kitt Peak || Spacewatch || — || align=right data-sort-value="0.66" | 660 m || 
|-id=129 bgcolor=#fefefe
| 426129 ||  || — || March 12, 2002 || Kitt Peak || Spacewatch || — || align=right data-sort-value="0.66" | 660 m || 
|-id=130 bgcolor=#fefefe
| 426130 ||  || — || August 15, 2009 || Kitt Peak || Spacewatch || MAS || align=right data-sort-value="0.90" | 900 m || 
|-id=131 bgcolor=#E9E9E9
| 426131 ||  || — || March 31, 2003 || Kitt Peak || Spacewatch || — || align=right | 1.6 km || 
|-id=132 bgcolor=#fefefe
| 426132 ||  || — || May 16, 2005 || Catalina || CSS || — || align=right data-sort-value="0.96" | 960 m || 
|-id=133 bgcolor=#E9E9E9
| 426133 ||  || — || December 21, 2006 || Kitt Peak || Spacewatch || BRG || align=right | 1.8 km || 
|-id=134 bgcolor=#E9E9E9
| 426134 ||  || — || April 20, 2012 || Mount Lemmon || Mount Lemmon Survey || AGN || align=right | 1.2 km || 
|-id=135 bgcolor=#E9E9E9
| 426135 ||  || — || April 17, 2012 || Kitt Peak || Spacewatch || — || align=right | 1.2 km || 
|-id=136 bgcolor=#E9E9E9
| 426136 ||  || — || April 1, 2012 || Mount Lemmon || Mount Lemmon Survey || EUN || align=right | 1.4 km || 
|-id=137 bgcolor=#E9E9E9
| 426137 ||  || — || April 24, 2003 || Kitt Peak || Spacewatch || — || align=right | 2.4 km || 
|-id=138 bgcolor=#fefefe
| 426138 ||  || — || January 30, 2008 || Kitt Peak || Spacewatch || NYS || align=right data-sort-value="0.58" | 580 m || 
|-id=139 bgcolor=#fefefe
| 426139 ||  || — || December 30, 2007 || Kitt Peak || Spacewatch || — || align=right data-sort-value="0.71" | 710 m || 
|-id=140 bgcolor=#E9E9E9
| 426140 ||  || — || October 22, 2009 || Mount Lemmon || Mount Lemmon Survey || — || align=right | 2.9 km || 
|-id=141 bgcolor=#fefefe
| 426141 ||  || — || October 3, 2006 || Mount Lemmon || Mount Lemmon Survey || — || align=right data-sort-value="0.91" | 910 m || 
|-id=142 bgcolor=#fefefe
| 426142 ||  || — || February 7, 2008 || Kitt Peak || Spacewatch || — || align=right data-sort-value="0.79" | 790 m || 
|-id=143 bgcolor=#d6d6d6
| 426143 ||  || — || April 19, 2012 || Catalina || CSS || — || align=right | 3.9 km || 
|-id=144 bgcolor=#fefefe
| 426144 ||  || — || April 17, 2005 || Kitt Peak || Spacewatch || — || align=right | 1.2 km || 
|-id=145 bgcolor=#fefefe
| 426145 ||  || — || March 4, 2008 || Mount Lemmon || Mount Lemmon Survey || — || align=right data-sort-value="0.78" | 780 m || 
|-id=146 bgcolor=#E9E9E9
| 426146 ||  || — || April 29, 2012 || Mount Lemmon || Mount Lemmon Survey || — || align=right | 1.3 km || 
|-id=147 bgcolor=#d6d6d6
| 426147 ||  || — || October 6, 2008 || Mount Lemmon || Mount Lemmon Survey || — || align=right | 3.1 km || 
|-id=148 bgcolor=#fefefe
| 426148 ||  || — || April 16, 2012 || Catalina || CSS || — || align=right data-sort-value="0.86" | 860 m || 
|-id=149 bgcolor=#fefefe
| 426149 ||  || — || April 16, 2012 || Kitt Peak || Spacewatch || — || align=right data-sort-value="0.79" | 790 m || 
|-id=150 bgcolor=#E9E9E9
| 426150 ||  || — || March 29, 2012 || Kitt Peak || Spacewatch || — || align=right | 2.3 km || 
|-id=151 bgcolor=#E9E9E9
| 426151 ||  || — || November 20, 2009 || Kitt Peak || Spacewatch || — || align=right | 1.7 km || 
|-id=152 bgcolor=#E9E9E9
| 426152 ||  || — || January 12, 2008 || Mount Lemmon || Mount Lemmon Survey || — || align=right | 2.1 km || 
|-id=153 bgcolor=#fefefe
| 426153 ||  || — || May 14, 2005 || Mount Lemmon || Mount Lemmon Survey || — || align=right data-sort-value="0.78" | 780 m || 
|-id=154 bgcolor=#E9E9E9
| 426154 ||  || — || October 31, 2005 || Kitt Peak || Spacewatch || — || align=right | 1.5 km || 
|-id=155 bgcolor=#fefefe
| 426155 ||  || — || November 27, 2010 || Mount Lemmon || Mount Lemmon Survey || — || align=right data-sort-value="0.74" | 740 m || 
|-id=156 bgcolor=#E9E9E9
| 426156 ||  || — || November 27, 2006 || Mount Lemmon || Mount Lemmon Survey || — || align=right | 1.8 km || 
|-id=157 bgcolor=#fefefe
| 426157 ||  || — || March 10, 2005 || Anderson Mesa || LONEOS || — || align=right data-sort-value="0.85" | 850 m || 
|-id=158 bgcolor=#E9E9E9
| 426158 ||  || — || November 16, 2009 || Mount Lemmon || Mount Lemmon Survey || (5) || align=right data-sort-value="0.84" | 840 m || 
|-id=159 bgcolor=#fefefe
| 426159 ||  || — || June 9, 2005 || Kitt Peak || Spacewatch || — || align=right data-sort-value="0.65" | 650 m || 
|-id=160 bgcolor=#fefefe
| 426160 ||  || — || October 23, 2006 || Kitt Peak || Spacewatch || — || align=right data-sort-value="0.76" | 760 m || 
|-id=161 bgcolor=#fefefe
| 426161 ||  || — || April 1, 2005 || Kitt Peak || Spacewatch || V || align=right data-sort-value="0.60" | 600 m || 
|-id=162 bgcolor=#E9E9E9
| 426162 ||  || — || September 21, 2000 || Anderson Mesa || LONEOS || — || align=right | 1.4 km || 
|-id=163 bgcolor=#fefefe
| 426163 ||  || — || November 19, 2006 || Kitt Peak || Spacewatch || — || align=right data-sort-value="0.78" | 780 m || 
|-id=164 bgcolor=#E9E9E9
| 426164 ||  || — || October 23, 2001 || Kitt Peak || Spacewatch || MAR || align=right | 1.1 km || 
|-id=165 bgcolor=#fefefe
| 426165 ||  || — || March 6, 2008 || Mount Lemmon || Mount Lemmon Survey || — || align=right data-sort-value="0.55" | 550 m || 
|-id=166 bgcolor=#fefefe
| 426166 ||  || — || October 28, 2006 || Kitt Peak || Spacewatch || — || align=right data-sort-value="0.77" | 770 m || 
|-id=167 bgcolor=#fefefe
| 426167 ||  || — || November 1, 2010 || Mount Lemmon || Mount Lemmon Survey || — || align=right | 1.4 km || 
|-id=168 bgcolor=#E9E9E9
| 426168 ||  || — || March 31, 2003 || Kitt Peak || Spacewatch || — || align=right | 1.5 km || 
|-id=169 bgcolor=#fefefe
| 426169 ||  || — || January 10, 2008 || Mount Lemmon || Mount Lemmon Survey || — || align=right | 1.0 km || 
|-id=170 bgcolor=#fefefe
| 426170 ||  || — || April 10, 2005 || Mount Lemmon || Mount Lemmon Survey || — || align=right data-sort-value="0.72" | 720 m || 
|-id=171 bgcolor=#fefefe
| 426171 ||  || — || March 4, 2005 || Catalina || CSS || — || align=right data-sort-value="0.75" | 750 m || 
|-id=172 bgcolor=#fefefe
| 426172 ||  || — || March 15, 2012 || Mount Lemmon || Mount Lemmon Survey || — || align=right data-sort-value="0.95" | 950 m || 
|-id=173 bgcolor=#fefefe
| 426173 ||  || — || January 20, 2008 || Kitt Peak || Spacewatch || — || align=right data-sort-value="0.68" | 680 m || 
|-id=174 bgcolor=#fefefe
| 426174 ||  || — || February 12, 2004 || Kitt Peak || Spacewatch || — || align=right data-sort-value="0.80" | 800 m || 
|-id=175 bgcolor=#fefefe
| 426175 ||  || — || March 12, 2008 || Mount Lemmon || Mount Lemmon Survey || — || align=right data-sort-value="0.75" | 750 m || 
|-id=176 bgcolor=#d6d6d6
| 426176 ||  || — || February 23, 2011 || Catalina || CSS || — || align=right | 3.3 km || 
|-id=177 bgcolor=#d6d6d6
| 426177 ||  || — || October 21, 2009 || Mount Lemmon || Mount Lemmon Survey || — || align=right | 3.2 km || 
|-id=178 bgcolor=#E9E9E9
| 426178 ||  || — || January 28, 2011 || Mount Lemmon || Mount Lemmon Survey || — || align=right | 2.4 km || 
|-id=179 bgcolor=#E9E9E9
| 426179 ||  || — || May 8, 2008 || Mount Lemmon || Mount Lemmon Survey || (5) || align=right data-sort-value="0.70" | 700 m || 
|-id=180 bgcolor=#fefefe
| 426180 ||  || — || February 27, 2008 || Mount Lemmon || Mount Lemmon Survey || MAS || align=right data-sort-value="0.73" | 730 m || 
|-id=181 bgcolor=#E9E9E9
| 426181 ||  || — || January 27, 2007 || Kitt Peak || Spacewatch || — || align=right | 1.8 km || 
|-id=182 bgcolor=#E9E9E9
| 426182 ||  || — || February 18, 2007 || Anderson Mesa || LONEOS || MAR || align=right | 1.5 km || 
|-id=183 bgcolor=#E9E9E9
| 426183 ||  || — || January 30, 2011 || Mount Lemmon || Mount Lemmon Survey || MRX || align=right | 1.1 km || 
|-id=184 bgcolor=#fefefe
| 426184 ||  || — || February 2, 2008 || Kitt Peak || Spacewatch || NYS || align=right data-sort-value="0.55" | 550 m || 
|-id=185 bgcolor=#E9E9E9
| 426185 ||  || — || October 28, 2005 || Kitt Peak || Spacewatch || — || align=right data-sort-value="0.98" | 980 m || 
|-id=186 bgcolor=#E9E9E9
| 426186 ||  || — || October 2, 1995 || Kitt Peak || Spacewatch || — || align=right | 2.4 km || 
|-id=187 bgcolor=#E9E9E9
| 426187 ||  || — || April 29, 2012 || Mount Lemmon || Mount Lemmon Survey || GEF || align=right | 1.2 km || 
|-id=188 bgcolor=#E9E9E9
| 426188 ||  || — || October 11, 2004 || Kitt Peak || Spacewatch || AEO || align=right | 1.1 km || 
|-id=189 bgcolor=#fefefe
| 426189 ||  || — || November 23, 2006 || Kitt Peak || Spacewatch || V || align=right data-sort-value="0.60" | 600 m || 
|-id=190 bgcolor=#E9E9E9
| 426190 ||  || — || November 21, 2006 || Mount Lemmon || Mount Lemmon Survey || RAF || align=right | 1.1 km || 
|-id=191 bgcolor=#fefefe
| 426191 ||  || — || March 29, 2012 || Kitt Peak || Spacewatch || — || align=right data-sort-value="0.87" | 870 m || 
|-id=192 bgcolor=#E9E9E9
| 426192 ||  || — || March 28, 2012 || Kitt Peak || Spacewatch || — || align=right data-sort-value="0.98" | 980 m || 
|-id=193 bgcolor=#E9E9E9
| 426193 ||  || — || November 17, 2009 || Mount Lemmon || Mount Lemmon Survey || — || align=right | 2.3 km || 
|-id=194 bgcolor=#fefefe
| 426194 ||  || — || May 1, 2012 || Mount Lemmon || Mount Lemmon Survey || — || align=right data-sort-value="0.64" | 640 m || 
|-id=195 bgcolor=#E9E9E9
| 426195 ||  || — || November 11, 2009 || Kitt Peak || Spacewatch || MAR || align=right | 1.0 km || 
|-id=196 bgcolor=#fefefe
| 426196 ||  || — || March 29, 2012 || Mount Lemmon || Mount Lemmon Survey || NYS || align=right data-sort-value="0.54" | 540 m || 
|-id=197 bgcolor=#E9E9E9
| 426197 ||  || — || March 29, 2012 || Kitt Peak || Spacewatch || — || align=right | 1.9 km || 
|-id=198 bgcolor=#E9E9E9
| 426198 ||  || — || February 10, 2007 || Mount Lemmon || Mount Lemmon Survey || — || align=right | 3.0 km || 
|-id=199 bgcolor=#E9E9E9
| 426199 ||  || — || October 31, 2005 || Mount Lemmon || Mount Lemmon Survey || (1547) || align=right | 1.6 km || 
|-id=200 bgcolor=#E9E9E9
| 426200 ||  || — || January 10, 2007 || Mount Lemmon || Mount Lemmon Survey || — || align=right | 1.4 km || 
|}

426201–426300 

|-bgcolor=#E9E9E9
| 426201 ||  || — || September 27, 2009 || Mount Lemmon || Mount Lemmon Survey || — || align=right | 2.4 km || 
|-id=202 bgcolor=#E9E9E9
| 426202 ||  || — || November 3, 2010 || Mount Lemmon || Mount Lemmon Survey || — || align=right | 2.3 km || 
|-id=203 bgcolor=#fefefe
| 426203 ||  || — || May 19, 2005 || Mount Lemmon || Mount Lemmon Survey || critical || align=right data-sort-value="0.59" | 590 m || 
|-id=204 bgcolor=#d6d6d6
| 426204 ||  || — || March 10, 2011 || Mount Lemmon || Mount Lemmon Survey || Tj (2.97) || align=right | 4.0 km || 
|-id=205 bgcolor=#E9E9E9
| 426205 ||  || — || April 19, 2012 || Mount Lemmon || Mount Lemmon Survey || (5) || align=right data-sort-value="0.92" | 920 m || 
|-id=206 bgcolor=#fefefe
| 426206 ||  || — || May 14, 2005 || Mount Lemmon || Mount Lemmon Survey || — || align=right data-sort-value="0.62" | 620 m || 
|-id=207 bgcolor=#fefefe
| 426207 ||  || — || March 12, 2005 || Socorro || LINEAR || — || align=right data-sort-value="0.76" | 760 m || 
|-id=208 bgcolor=#fefefe
| 426208 ||  || — || May 20, 2005 || Mount Lemmon || Mount Lemmon Survey || — || align=right data-sort-value="0.68" | 680 m || 
|-id=209 bgcolor=#fefefe
| 426209 ||  || — || September 29, 2005 || Kitt Peak || Spacewatch || — || align=right data-sort-value="0.70" | 700 m || 
|-id=210 bgcolor=#fefefe
| 426210 ||  || — || February 1, 2005 || Kitt Peak || Spacewatch || — || align=right data-sort-value="0.71" | 710 m || 
|-id=211 bgcolor=#E9E9E9
| 426211 ||  || — || January 31, 2006 || Mount Lemmon || Mount Lemmon Survey || — || align=right | 2.2 km || 
|-id=212 bgcolor=#E9E9E9
| 426212 ||  || — || February 25, 2012 || Mount Lemmon || Mount Lemmon Survey || — || align=right | 2.0 km || 
|-id=213 bgcolor=#d6d6d6
| 426213 ||  || — || October 26, 2009 || Mount Lemmon || Mount Lemmon Survey || — || align=right | 5.5 km || 
|-id=214 bgcolor=#d6d6d6
| 426214 ||  || — || February 25, 2006 || Mount Lemmon || Mount Lemmon Survey || — || align=right | 3.6 km || 
|-id=215 bgcolor=#fefefe
| 426215 ||  || — || March 2, 2008 || XuYi || PMO NEO || — || align=right data-sort-value="0.89" | 890 m || 
|-id=216 bgcolor=#E9E9E9
| 426216 ||  || — || May 21, 2012 || Mount Lemmon || Mount Lemmon Survey || — || align=right | 1.9 km || 
|-id=217 bgcolor=#E9E9E9
| 426217 ||  || — || May 21, 2012 || Mount Lemmon || Mount Lemmon Survey || NEM || align=right | 2.4 km || 
|-id=218 bgcolor=#E9E9E9
| 426218 ||  || — || May 31, 2008 || Mount Lemmon || Mount Lemmon Survey || — || align=right | 1.8 km || 
|-id=219 bgcolor=#E9E9E9
| 426219 ||  || — || March 25, 2007 || Mount Lemmon || Mount Lemmon Survey || GEF || align=right | 1.3 km || 
|-id=220 bgcolor=#d6d6d6
| 426220 ||  || — || January 13, 2005 || Kitt Peak || Spacewatch || EOS || align=right | 2.0 km || 
|-id=221 bgcolor=#E9E9E9
| 426221 ||  || — || November 25, 2005 || Kitt Peak || Spacewatch || — || align=right | 1.9 km || 
|-id=222 bgcolor=#E9E9E9
| 426222 ||  || — || May 8, 2008 || Mount Lemmon || Mount Lemmon Survey || — || align=right data-sort-value="0.99" | 990 m || 
|-id=223 bgcolor=#E9E9E9
| 426223 ||  || — || October 14, 2009 || Mount Lemmon || Mount Lemmon Survey || WIT || align=right | 1.0 km || 
|-id=224 bgcolor=#E9E9E9
| 426224 ||  || — || May 1, 2003 || Kitt Peak || Spacewatch || — || align=right | 1.8 km || 
|-id=225 bgcolor=#E9E9E9
| 426225 ||  || — || March 13, 2007 || Kitt Peak || Spacewatch || — || align=right | 2.3 km || 
|-id=226 bgcolor=#d6d6d6
| 426226 ||  || — || June 20, 2007 || Kitt Peak || Spacewatch || — || align=right | 4.6 km || 
|-id=227 bgcolor=#fefefe
| 426227 ||  || — || March 28, 2008 || Kitt Peak || Spacewatch || — || align=right data-sort-value="0.79" | 790 m || 
|-id=228 bgcolor=#E9E9E9
| 426228 ||  || — || October 16, 2009 || Mount Lemmon || Mount Lemmon Survey || EUN || align=right | 1.2 km || 
|-id=229 bgcolor=#E9E9E9
| 426229 ||  || — || March 14, 2007 || Catalina || CSS || EUN || align=right | 1.5 km || 
|-id=230 bgcolor=#d6d6d6
| 426230 ||  || — || January 6, 2010 || Kitt Peak || Spacewatch || — || align=right | 3.9 km || 
|-id=231 bgcolor=#d6d6d6
| 426231 ||  || — || September 12, 2001 || Socorro || LINEAR || LIX || align=right | 3.3 km || 
|-id=232 bgcolor=#d6d6d6
| 426232 ||  || — || May 18, 2010 || WISE || WISE || — || align=right | 4.7 km || 
|-id=233 bgcolor=#d6d6d6
| 426233 ||  || — || May 17, 2012 || Mount Lemmon || Mount Lemmon Survey || — || align=right | 3.2 km || 
|-id=234 bgcolor=#E9E9E9
| 426234 ||  || — || May 25, 2003 || Kitt Peak || Spacewatch || — || align=right | 1.6 km || 
|-id=235 bgcolor=#fefefe
| 426235 ||  || — || May 13, 2004 || Kitt Peak || Spacewatch || NYS || align=right data-sort-value="0.76" | 760 m || 
|-id=236 bgcolor=#d6d6d6
| 426236 ||  || — || November 20, 2007 || Mount Lemmon || Mount Lemmon Survey || — || align=right | 2.9 km || 
|-id=237 bgcolor=#d6d6d6
| 426237 ||  || — || October 14, 2007 || Catalina || CSS || — || align=right | 3.7 km || 
|-id=238 bgcolor=#d6d6d6
| 426238 ||  || — || October 11, 2007 || Mount Lemmon || Mount Lemmon Survey || VER || align=right | 2.2 km || 
|-id=239 bgcolor=#d6d6d6
| 426239 ||  || — || June 27, 2010 || WISE || WISE || — || align=right | 4.5 km || 
|-id=240 bgcolor=#d6d6d6
| 426240 ||  || — || April 30, 2011 || Kitt Peak || Spacewatch || — || align=right | 2.5 km || 
|-id=241 bgcolor=#d6d6d6
| 426241 ||  || — || March 25, 2006 || Kitt Peak || Spacewatch || — || align=right | 2.8 km || 
|-id=242 bgcolor=#E9E9E9
| 426242 ||  || — || February 26, 2007 || Mount Lemmon || Mount Lemmon Survey || — || align=right | 1.2 km || 
|-id=243 bgcolor=#d6d6d6
| 426243 ||  || — || January 18, 2010 || WISE || WISE || — || align=right | 4.0 km || 
|-id=244 bgcolor=#d6d6d6
| 426244 ||  || — || June 5, 2010 || WISE || WISE || — || align=right | 6.0 km || 
|-id=245 bgcolor=#d6d6d6
| 426245 ||  || — || March 11, 2005 || Kitt Peak || Spacewatch || EOS || align=right | 1.9 km || 
|-id=246 bgcolor=#d6d6d6
| 426246 ||  || — || May 28, 2012 || Mount Lemmon || Mount Lemmon Survey || — || align=right | 3.0 km || 
|-id=247 bgcolor=#E9E9E9
| 426247 ||  || — || May 11, 2007 || Catalina || CSS || — || align=right | 3.0 km || 
|-id=248 bgcolor=#fefefe
| 426248 ||  || — || November 14, 2001 || Kitt Peak || Spacewatch || — || align=right | 1.1 km || 
|-id=249 bgcolor=#d6d6d6
| 426249 ||  || — || May 11, 2010 || WISE || WISE || — || align=right | 4.1 km || 
|-id=250 bgcolor=#d6d6d6
| 426250 ||  || — || July 22, 1995 || Kitt Peak || Spacewatch || — || align=right | 3.3 km || 
|-id=251 bgcolor=#d6d6d6
| 426251 ||  || — || September 20, 2001 || Socorro || LINEAR || — || align=right | 3.4 km || 
|-id=252 bgcolor=#E9E9E9
| 426252 ||  || — || February 23, 1998 || Kitt Peak || Spacewatch || — || align=right | 1.0 km || 
|-id=253 bgcolor=#d6d6d6
| 426253 ||  || — || September 19, 2001 || Socorro || LINEAR || — || align=right | 3.4 km || 
|-id=254 bgcolor=#d6d6d6
| 426254 ||  || — || April 18, 2010 || WISE || WISE || — || align=right | 2.9 km || 
|-id=255 bgcolor=#FA8072
| 426255 ||  || — || April 20, 2004 || Kitt Peak || Spacewatch || — || align=right | 1.5 km || 
|-id=256 bgcolor=#d6d6d6
| 426256 ||  || — || March 19, 2010 || Mount Lemmon || Mount Lemmon Survey || — || align=right | 4.2 km || 
|-id=257 bgcolor=#d6d6d6
| 426257 ||  || — || February 22, 1998 || Kitt Peak || Spacewatch || — || align=right | 3.6 km || 
|-id=258 bgcolor=#d6d6d6
| 426258 ||  || — || March 18, 2004 || Socorro || LINEAR || — || align=right | 4.1 km || 
|-id=259 bgcolor=#E9E9E9
| 426259 ||  || — || February 14, 2010 || Mount Lemmon || Mount Lemmon Survey || — || align=right | 2.3 km || 
|-id=260 bgcolor=#d6d6d6
| 426260 ||  || — || August 24, 2012 || Kitt Peak || Spacewatch || — || align=right | 3.0 km || 
|-id=261 bgcolor=#E9E9E9
| 426261 ||  || — || September 28, 2008 || Mount Lemmon || Mount Lemmon Survey || — || align=right | 1.5 km || 
|-id=262 bgcolor=#d6d6d6
| 426262 ||  || — || April 5, 2005 || Mount Lemmon || Mount Lemmon Survey || — || align=right | 3.7 km || 
|-id=263 bgcolor=#d6d6d6
| 426263 ||  || — || November 1, 2008 || Mount Lemmon || Mount Lemmon Survey || EOS || align=right | 2.5 km || 
|-id=264 bgcolor=#E9E9E9
| 426264 ||  || — || September 19, 2003 || Socorro || LINEAR || — || align=right | 2.7 km || 
|-id=265 bgcolor=#d6d6d6
| 426265 ||  || — || October 8, 2007 || Catalina || CSS || — || align=right | 3.2 km || 
|-id=266 bgcolor=#d6d6d6
| 426266 ||  || — || May 25, 2010 || WISE || WISE || — || align=right | 4.5 km || 
|-id=267 bgcolor=#E9E9E9
| 426267 ||  || — || March 27, 2011 || Mount Lemmon || Mount Lemmon Survey || — || align=right | 1.2 km || 
|-id=268 bgcolor=#d6d6d6
| 426268 ||  || — || October 11, 2007 || Kitt Peak || Spacewatch || — || align=right | 2.5 km || 
|-id=269 bgcolor=#d6d6d6
| 426269 ||  || — || March 10, 2005 || Mount Lemmon || Mount Lemmon Survey || — || align=right | 3.4 km || 
|-id=270 bgcolor=#E9E9E9
| 426270 ||  || — || September 6, 2008 || Catalina || CSS || — || align=right | 1.0 km || 
|-id=271 bgcolor=#d6d6d6
| 426271 ||  || — || February 13, 2010 || Kitt Peak || Spacewatch || — || align=right | 3.9 km || 
|-id=272 bgcolor=#E9E9E9
| 426272 ||  || — || November 12, 2005 || Kitt Peak || Spacewatch || — || align=right | 2.6 km || 
|-id=273 bgcolor=#d6d6d6
| 426273 ||  || — || April 1, 2005 || Kitt Peak || Spacewatch || — || align=right | 2.8 km || 
|-id=274 bgcolor=#d6d6d6
| 426274 ||  || — || February 17, 2010 || Kitt Peak || Spacewatch || — || align=right | 3.9 km || 
|-id=275 bgcolor=#d6d6d6
| 426275 ||  || — || October 21, 2007 || Kitt Peak || Spacewatch || EOS || align=right | 2.0 km || 
|-id=276 bgcolor=#d6d6d6
| 426276 ||  || — || October 9, 2007 || Kitt Peak || Spacewatch || — || align=right | 2.5 km || 
|-id=277 bgcolor=#E9E9E9
| 426277 ||  || — || September 14, 2007 || Kitt Peak || Spacewatch || — || align=right | 2.4 km || 
|-id=278 bgcolor=#d6d6d6
| 426278 ||  || — || March 19, 2010 || Kitt Peak || Spacewatch || — || align=right | 2.8 km || 
|-id=279 bgcolor=#d6d6d6
| 426279 ||  || — || May 16, 2005 || Mount Lemmon || Mount Lemmon Survey || VER || align=right | 2.7 km || 
|-id=280 bgcolor=#d6d6d6
| 426280 ||  || — || March 16, 2004 || Kitt Peak || Spacewatch || VER || align=right | 2.5 km || 
|-id=281 bgcolor=#E9E9E9
| 426281 ||  || — || September 17, 2003 || Kitt Peak || Spacewatch || — || align=right | 2.7 km || 
|-id=282 bgcolor=#d6d6d6
| 426282 ||  || — || October 8, 2007 || Catalina || CSS || — || align=right | 3.6 km || 
|-id=283 bgcolor=#E9E9E9
| 426283 ||  || — || June 17, 2007 || Kitt Peak || Spacewatch || ADE || align=right | 2.2 km || 
|-id=284 bgcolor=#d6d6d6
| 426284 ||  || — || February 15, 2010 || Kitt Peak || Spacewatch || — || align=right | 5.3 km || 
|-id=285 bgcolor=#d6d6d6
| 426285 ||  || — || September 22, 1995 || Kitt Peak || Spacewatch || — || align=right | 3.5 km || 
|-id=286 bgcolor=#d6d6d6
| 426286 ||  || — || September 13, 2007 || Mount Lemmon || Mount Lemmon Survey || — || align=right | 2.6 km || 
|-id=287 bgcolor=#d6d6d6
| 426287 ||  || — || July 21, 2006 || Mount Lemmon || Mount Lemmon Survey || — || align=right | 4.0 km || 
|-id=288 bgcolor=#d6d6d6
| 426288 ||  || — || September 19, 2001 || Socorro || LINEAR || — || align=right | 2.7 km || 
|-id=289 bgcolor=#C2FFFF
| 426289 ||  || — || September 24, 2012 || Kitt Peak || Spacewatch || L5 || align=right | 7.1 km || 
|-id=290 bgcolor=#d6d6d6
| 426290 ||  || — || September 15, 2006 || Kitt Peak || Spacewatch || — || align=right | 3.4 km || 
|-id=291 bgcolor=#d6d6d6
| 426291 ||  || — || September 19, 2001 || Socorro || LINEAR || THM || align=right | 2.6 km || 
|-id=292 bgcolor=#C2FFFF
| 426292 ||  || — || April 14, 2008 || Mount Lemmon || Mount Lemmon Survey || L5 || align=right | 9.6 km || 
|-id=293 bgcolor=#d6d6d6
| 426293 ||  || — || March 11, 2005 || Mount Lemmon || Mount Lemmon Survey || — || align=right | 3.4 km || 
|-id=294 bgcolor=#d6d6d6
| 426294 ||  || — || April 11, 2005 || Kitt Peak || Spacewatch || TIR || align=right | 2.7 km || 
|-id=295 bgcolor=#d6d6d6
| 426295 ||  || — || July 26, 1995 || Kitt Peak || Spacewatch || — || align=right | 2.9 km || 
|-id=296 bgcolor=#d6d6d6
| 426296 ||  || — || May 6, 2006 || Mount Lemmon || Mount Lemmon Survey || — || align=right | 2.4 km || 
|-id=297 bgcolor=#d6d6d6
| 426297 ||  || — || March 17, 2009 || Kitt Peak || Spacewatch || 7:4 || align=right | 3.6 km || 
|-id=298 bgcolor=#E9E9E9
| 426298 ||  || — || October 24, 2008 || Kitt Peak || Spacewatch || — || align=right | 2.0 km || 
|-id=299 bgcolor=#d6d6d6
| 426299 ||  || — || October 20, 2007 || Mount Lemmon || Mount Lemmon Survey || — || align=right | 3.8 km || 
|-id=300 bgcolor=#fefefe
| 426300 ||  || — || July 26, 2008 || Siding Spring || SSS || — || align=right | 1.0 km || 
|}

426301–426400 

|-bgcolor=#E9E9E9
| 426301 ||  || — || September 30, 2000 || Kitt Peak || Spacewatch || — || align=right data-sort-value="0.99" | 990 m || 
|-id=302 bgcolor=#d6d6d6
| 426302 ||  || — || January 16, 2009 || Kitt Peak || Spacewatch || EOS || align=right | 2.2 km || 
|-id=303 bgcolor=#d6d6d6
| 426303 ||  || — || September 13, 2007 || Kitt Peak || Spacewatch || EOS || align=right | 2.0 km || 
|-id=304 bgcolor=#d6d6d6
| 426304 ||  || — || March 21, 2010 || Mount Lemmon || Mount Lemmon Survey || EOS || align=right | 2.1 km || 
|-id=305 bgcolor=#d6d6d6
| 426305 ||  || — || November 18, 2007 || Kitt Peak || Spacewatch || HYG || align=right | 2.8 km || 
|-id=306 bgcolor=#d6d6d6
| 426306 ||  || — || September 28, 2006 || Kitt Peak || Spacewatch || — || align=right | 3.3 km || 
|-id=307 bgcolor=#d6d6d6
| 426307 ||  || — || April 10, 2005 || Mount Lemmon || Mount Lemmon Survey || — || align=right | 2.8 km || 
|-id=308 bgcolor=#d6d6d6
| 426308 ||  || — || October 12, 2007 || Mount Lemmon || Mount Lemmon Survey || — || align=right | 2.9 km || 
|-id=309 bgcolor=#d6d6d6
| 426309 ||  || — || April 14, 2004 || Kitt Peak || Spacewatch || — || align=right | 2.6 km || 
|-id=310 bgcolor=#d6d6d6
| 426310 ||  || — || December 20, 2007 || Mount Lemmon || Mount Lemmon Survey || — || align=right | 3.5 km || 
|-id=311 bgcolor=#C2FFFF
| 426311 ||  || — || September 16, 2012 || Kitt Peak || Spacewatch || L5 || align=right | 8.2 km || 
|-id=312 bgcolor=#fefefe
| 426312 ||  || — || April 21, 2004 || Kitt Peak || Spacewatch || — || align=right data-sort-value="0.82" | 820 m || 
|-id=313 bgcolor=#d6d6d6
| 426313 ||  || — || January 14, 2010 || WISE || WISE || — || align=right | 3.6 km || 
|-id=314 bgcolor=#E9E9E9
| 426314 ||  || — || May 6, 2006 || Mount Lemmon || Mount Lemmon Survey || AGN || align=right | 1.3 km || 
|-id=315 bgcolor=#d6d6d6
| 426315 ||  || — || March 8, 2005 || Mount Lemmon || Mount Lemmon Survey || KOR || align=right | 1.4 km || 
|-id=316 bgcolor=#d6d6d6
| 426316 ||  || — || February 14, 2009 || Mount Lemmon || Mount Lemmon Survey || THM || align=right | 2.9 km || 
|-id=317 bgcolor=#d6d6d6
| 426317 ||  || — || April 12, 2005 || Kitt Peak || Spacewatch || — || align=right | 3.4 km || 
|-id=318 bgcolor=#d6d6d6
| 426318 ||  || — || December 21, 2008 || Mount Lemmon || Mount Lemmon Survey || — || align=right | 2.8 km || 
|-id=319 bgcolor=#fefefe
| 426319 ||  || — || December 14, 2001 || Socorro || LINEAR || — || align=right | 2.6 km || 
|-id=320 bgcolor=#d6d6d6
| 426320 ||  || — || March 11, 2005 || Kitt Peak || Spacewatch || KOR || align=right | 1.9 km || 
|-id=321 bgcolor=#E9E9E9
| 426321 ||  || — || November 8, 2008 || Kitt Peak || Spacewatch || — || align=right | 1.5 km || 
|-id=322 bgcolor=#d6d6d6
| 426322 ||  || — || April 14, 2004 || Kitt Peak || Spacewatch || — || align=right | 4.3 km || 
|-id=323 bgcolor=#d6d6d6
| 426323 ||  || — || November 2, 2007 || Mount Lemmon || Mount Lemmon Survey || — || align=right | 3.3 km || 
|-id=324 bgcolor=#E9E9E9
| 426324 ||  || — || May 11, 2007 || Kitt Peak || Spacewatch || KON || align=right | 3.8 km || 
|-id=325 bgcolor=#d6d6d6
| 426325 ||  || — || September 15, 2006 || Kitt Peak || Spacewatch || — || align=right | 2.8 km || 
|-id=326 bgcolor=#C2FFFF
| 426326 ||  || — || March 14, 2007 || Kitt Peak || Spacewatch || L5 || align=right | 8.2 km || 
|-id=327 bgcolor=#d6d6d6
| 426327 ||  || — || September 19, 2006 || Anderson Mesa || LONEOS || — || align=right | 3.2 km || 
|-id=328 bgcolor=#d6d6d6
| 426328 ||  || — || August 27, 2006 || Kitt Peak || Spacewatch || — || align=right | 4.9 km || 
|-id=329 bgcolor=#E9E9E9
| 426329 ||  || — || October 8, 1999 || Kitt Peak || Spacewatch || — || align=right | 1.7 km || 
|-id=330 bgcolor=#E9E9E9
| 426330 ||  || — || April 30, 2006 || Kitt Peak || Spacewatch || — || align=right | 2.8 km || 
|-id=331 bgcolor=#E9E9E9
| 426331 ||  || — || February 25, 2006 || Kitt Peak || Spacewatch || — || align=right | 1.7 km || 
|-id=332 bgcolor=#d6d6d6
| 426332 ||  || — || September 19, 2006 || Kitt Peak || Spacewatch || — || align=right | 2.3 km || 
|-id=333 bgcolor=#d6d6d6
| 426333 ||  || — || February 13, 2010 || WISE || WISE || — || align=right | 3.9 km || 
|-id=334 bgcolor=#d6d6d6
| 426334 ||  || — || October 2, 2006 || Catalina || CSS || — || align=right | 3.5 km || 
|-id=335 bgcolor=#d6d6d6
| 426335 ||  || — || October 18, 2006 || Kitt Peak || Spacewatch || — || align=right | 3.3 km || 
|-id=336 bgcolor=#d6d6d6
| 426336 ||  || — || November 7, 2007 || Catalina || CSS || — || align=right | 3.5 km || 
|-id=337 bgcolor=#d6d6d6
| 426337 ||  || — || July 22, 2006 || Mount Lemmon || Mount Lemmon Survey || — || align=right | 4.1 km || 
|-id=338 bgcolor=#d6d6d6
| 426338 ||  || — || March 31, 2004 || Kitt Peak || Spacewatch || — || align=right | 3.3 km || 
|-id=339 bgcolor=#d6d6d6
| 426339 ||  || — || December 16, 2007 || Mount Lemmon || Mount Lemmon Survey || — || align=right | 3.2 km || 
|-id=340 bgcolor=#fefefe
| 426340 ||  || — || September 14, 2006 || Catalina || CSS || H || align=right data-sort-value="0.78" | 780 m || 
|-id=341 bgcolor=#fefefe
| 426341 ||  || — || April 27, 2000 || Kitt Peak || Spacewatch || — || align=right data-sort-value="0.68" | 680 m || 
|-id=342 bgcolor=#fefefe
| 426342 ||  || — || April 7, 2010 || WISE || WISE || — || align=right | 1.3 km || 
|-id=343 bgcolor=#fefefe
| 426343 ||  || — || July 4, 2010 || Kitt Peak || Spacewatch || — || align=right data-sort-value="0.87" | 870 m || 
|-id=344 bgcolor=#fefefe
| 426344 ||  || — || April 3, 2013 || Mount Lemmon || Mount Lemmon Survey || — || align=right data-sort-value="0.87" | 870 m || 
|-id=345 bgcolor=#fefefe
| 426345 ||  || — || April 11, 2013 || Catalina || CSS || H || align=right data-sort-value="0.71" | 710 m || 
|-id=346 bgcolor=#fefefe
| 426346 ||  || — || July 5, 1995 || Kitt Peak || Spacewatch || — || align=right | 1.3 km || 
|-id=347 bgcolor=#E9E9E9
| 426347 ||  || — || September 17, 2009 || Catalina || CSS || EUN || align=right | 1.3 km || 
|-id=348 bgcolor=#E9E9E9
| 426348 ||  || — || August 26, 2009 || Catalina || CSS || — || align=right | 2.3 km || 
|-id=349 bgcolor=#fefefe
| 426349 ||  || — || January 2, 2012 || Mount Lemmon || Mount Lemmon Survey || — || align=right data-sort-value="0.85" | 850 m || 
|-id=350 bgcolor=#fefefe
| 426350 ||  || — || November 21, 2006 || Mount Lemmon || Mount Lemmon Survey || H || align=right data-sort-value="0.64" | 640 m || 
|-id=351 bgcolor=#fefefe
| 426351 ||  || — || September 12, 2007 || Catalina || CSS || — || align=right data-sort-value="0.57" | 570 m || 
|-id=352 bgcolor=#fefefe
| 426352 ||  || — || October 8, 2007 || Anderson Mesa || LONEOS || — || align=right data-sort-value="0.91" | 910 m || 
|-id=353 bgcolor=#E9E9E9
| 426353 ||  || — || September 16, 2009 || Catalina || CSS || — || align=right | 1.5 km || 
|-id=354 bgcolor=#fefefe
| 426354 ||  || — || May 20, 2010 || Mount Lemmon || Mount Lemmon Survey || H || align=right data-sort-value="0.83" | 830 m || 
|-id=355 bgcolor=#d6d6d6
| 426355 ||  || — || September 23, 2008 || Catalina || CSS || — || align=right | 2.6 km || 
|-id=356 bgcolor=#d6d6d6
| 426356 ||  || — || April 18, 2010 || WISE || WISE || — || align=right | 3.4 km || 
|-id=357 bgcolor=#E9E9E9
| 426357 ||  || — || November 25, 2005 || Mount Lemmon || Mount Lemmon Survey || — || align=right | 1.9 km || 
|-id=358 bgcolor=#d6d6d6
| 426358 ||  || — || November 16, 2009 || Mount Lemmon || Mount Lemmon Survey || — || align=right | 4.3 km || 
|-id=359 bgcolor=#fefefe
| 426359 ||  || — || May 31, 2006 || Mount Lemmon || Mount Lemmon Survey || V || align=right data-sort-value="0.68" | 680 m || 
|-id=360 bgcolor=#fefefe
| 426360 ||  || — || November 26, 2003 || Kitt Peak || Spacewatch || V || align=right data-sort-value="0.62" | 620 m || 
|-id=361 bgcolor=#E9E9E9
| 426361 ||  || — || July 11, 2004 || Socorro || LINEAR || — || align=right | 2.5 km || 
|-id=362 bgcolor=#FA8072
| 426362 ||  || — || October 19, 2003 || Kitt Peak || Spacewatch || — || align=right data-sort-value="0.78" | 780 m || 
|-id=363 bgcolor=#fefefe
| 426363 ||  || — || August 28, 2006 || Catalina || CSS || — || align=right data-sort-value="0.78" | 780 m || 
|-id=364 bgcolor=#fefefe
| 426364 ||  || — || September 19, 2003 || Campo Imperatore || CINEOS || — || align=right data-sort-value="0.72" | 720 m || 
|-id=365 bgcolor=#fefefe
| 426365 ||  || — || November 21, 2006 || Mount Lemmon || Mount Lemmon Survey || — || align=right data-sort-value="0.95" | 950 m || 
|-id=366 bgcolor=#E9E9E9
| 426366 ||  || — || July 7, 2013 || Siding Spring || SSS || — || align=right | 3.1 km || 
|-id=367 bgcolor=#E9E9E9
| 426367 ||  || — || March 6, 2008 || Mount Lemmon || Mount Lemmon Survey || — || align=right | 1.0 km || 
|-id=368 bgcolor=#fefefe
| 426368 ||  || — || December 22, 2003 || Kitt Peak || Spacewatch || — || align=right data-sort-value="0.95" | 950 m || 
|-id=369 bgcolor=#E9E9E9
| 426369 ||  || — || October 26, 2005 || Kitt Peak || Spacewatch || — || align=right | 1.5 km || 
|-id=370 bgcolor=#fefefe
| 426370 ||  || — || September 10, 2010 || Mount Lemmon || Mount Lemmon Survey || — || align=right data-sort-value="0.67" | 670 m || 
|-id=371 bgcolor=#fefefe
| 426371 ||  || — || November 8, 2010 || Mount Lemmon || Mount Lemmon Survey || — || align=right data-sort-value="0.70" | 700 m || 
|-id=372 bgcolor=#d6d6d6
| 426372 ||  || — || January 6, 2010 || Catalina || CSS || — || align=right | 5.2 km || 
|-id=373 bgcolor=#fefefe
| 426373 ||  || — || July 13, 1999 || Socorro || LINEAR || — || align=right | 1.1 km || 
|-id=374 bgcolor=#E9E9E9
| 426374 ||  || — || February 23, 2012 || Catalina || CSS || — || align=right | 2.8 km || 
|-id=375 bgcolor=#fefefe
| 426375 ||  || — || October 27, 2006 || Mount Lemmon || Mount Lemmon Survey || — || align=right data-sort-value="0.88" | 880 m || 
|-id=376 bgcolor=#fefefe
| 426376 ||  || — || June 15, 2013 || Mount Lemmon || Mount Lemmon Survey || H || align=right data-sort-value="0.64" | 640 m || 
|-id=377 bgcolor=#E9E9E9
| 426377 ||  || — || September 23, 2009 || Catalina || CSS || (194) || align=right | 1.6 km || 
|-id=378 bgcolor=#fefefe
| 426378 ||  || — || January 31, 2009 || Mount Lemmon || Mount Lemmon Survey || — || align=right data-sort-value="0.58" | 580 m || 
|-id=379 bgcolor=#E9E9E9
| 426379 ||  || — || August 9, 2004 || Socorro || LINEAR || — || align=right | 2.0 km || 
|-id=380 bgcolor=#d6d6d6
| 426380 ||  || — || March 18, 2010 || WISE || WISE || — || align=right | 4.0 km || 
|-id=381 bgcolor=#fefefe
| 426381 ||  || — || October 14, 2010 || Mount Lemmon || Mount Lemmon Survey || — || align=right data-sort-value="0.81" | 810 m || 
|-id=382 bgcolor=#fefefe
| 426382 ||  || — || September 17, 1998 || Kitt Peak || Spacewatch || MAS || align=right data-sort-value="0.80" | 800 m || 
|-id=383 bgcolor=#E9E9E9
| 426383 ||  || — || July 28, 2009 || Kitt Peak || Spacewatch || — || align=right | 1.3 km || 
|-id=384 bgcolor=#E9E9E9
| 426384 ||  || — || August 2, 2000 || Socorro || LINEAR || — || align=right | 2.5 km || 
|-id=385 bgcolor=#fefefe
| 426385 ||  || — || August 9, 2013 || Kitt Peak || Spacewatch || — || align=right data-sort-value="0.75" | 750 m || 
|-id=386 bgcolor=#FA8072
| 426386 ||  || — || September 21, 2004 || Anderson Mesa || LONEOS || — || align=right | 2.7 km || 
|-id=387 bgcolor=#fefefe
| 426387 ||  || — || September 17, 2003 || Kitt Peak || Spacewatch || — || align=right data-sort-value="0.61" | 610 m || 
|-id=388 bgcolor=#E9E9E9
| 426388 ||  || — || March 20, 2007 || Mount Lemmon || Mount Lemmon Survey || HOF || align=right | 2.3 km || 
|-id=389 bgcolor=#fefefe
| 426389 ||  || — || March 10, 2008 || Kitt Peak || Spacewatch || — || align=right data-sort-value="0.67" | 670 m || 
|-id=390 bgcolor=#fefefe
| 426390 ||  || — || December 3, 2010 || Mount Lemmon || Mount Lemmon Survey || — || align=right | 1.1 km || 
|-id=391 bgcolor=#E9E9E9
| 426391 ||  || — || November 18, 2009 || Kitt Peak || Spacewatch || — || align=right | 2.1 km || 
|-id=392 bgcolor=#fefefe
| 426392 ||  || — || December 6, 2010 || Mount Lemmon || Mount Lemmon Survey || V || align=right data-sort-value="0.82" | 820 m || 
|-id=393 bgcolor=#E9E9E9
| 426393 ||  || — || August 26, 2000 || Socorro || LINEAR || — || align=right | 1.7 km || 
|-id=394 bgcolor=#E9E9E9
| 426394 ||  || — || May 19, 2012 || Mount Lemmon || Mount Lemmon Survey || — || align=right | 1.6 km || 
|-id=395 bgcolor=#fefefe
| 426395 ||  || — || August 21, 2006 || Kitt Peak || Spacewatch || V || align=right data-sort-value="0.58" | 580 m || 
|-id=396 bgcolor=#d6d6d6
| 426396 ||  || — || March 1, 2011 || Mount Lemmon || Mount Lemmon Survey || — || align=right | 3.2 km || 
|-id=397 bgcolor=#fefefe
| 426397 ||  || — || February 14, 2005 || Kitt Peak || Spacewatch || V || align=right data-sort-value="0.56" | 560 m || 
|-id=398 bgcolor=#E9E9E9
| 426398 ||  || — || November 9, 2009 || Kitt Peak || Spacewatch || — || align=right | 1.5 km || 
|-id=399 bgcolor=#d6d6d6
| 426399 ||  || — || September 7, 2008 || Mount Lemmon || Mount Lemmon Survey || — || align=right | 1.8 km || 
|-id=400 bgcolor=#E9E9E9
| 426400 ||  || — || August 7, 2004 || Campo Imperatore || CINEOS || — || align=right | 2.1 km || 
|}

426401–426500 

|-bgcolor=#fefefe
| 426401 ||  || — || September 18, 2010 || Mount Lemmon || Mount Lemmon Survey || — || align=right data-sort-value="0.80" | 800 m || 
|-id=402 bgcolor=#E9E9E9
| 426402 ||  || — || April 8, 2008 || Kitt Peak || Spacewatch || JUN || align=right | 1.2 km || 
|-id=403 bgcolor=#fefefe
| 426403 ||  || — || May 3, 2009 || Kitt Peak || Spacewatch || — || align=right data-sort-value="0.60" | 600 m || 
|-id=404 bgcolor=#E9E9E9
| 426404 ||  || — || September 22, 2009 || Catalina || CSS || — || align=right | 2.1 km || 
|-id=405 bgcolor=#fefefe
| 426405 ||  || — || August 29, 2006 || Kitt Peak || Spacewatch || — || align=right data-sort-value="0.60" | 600 m || 
|-id=406 bgcolor=#E9E9E9
| 426406 ||  || — || November 8, 2009 || Mount Lemmon || Mount Lemmon Survey || — || align=right | 2.2 km || 
|-id=407 bgcolor=#E9E9E9
| 426407 ||  || — || March 3, 2008 || Mount Lemmon || Mount Lemmon Survey || — || align=right | 1.3 km || 
|-id=408 bgcolor=#E9E9E9
| 426408 ||  || — || December 14, 2010 || Mount Lemmon || Mount Lemmon Survey || — || align=right | 2.9 km || 
|-id=409 bgcolor=#fefefe
| 426409 ||  || — || June 24, 2009 || Kitt Peak || Spacewatch || — || align=right | 1.0 km || 
|-id=410 bgcolor=#E9E9E9
| 426410 ||  || — || October 11, 2005 || Anderson Mesa || LONEOS || — || align=right | 2.1 km || 
|-id=411 bgcolor=#fefefe
| 426411 ||  || — || May 15, 2005 || Mount Lemmon || Mount Lemmon Survey || — || align=right data-sort-value="0.98" | 980 m || 
|-id=412 bgcolor=#E9E9E9
| 426412 ||  || — || November 27, 2009 || Mount Lemmon || Mount Lemmon Survey || — || align=right | 1.6 km || 
|-id=413 bgcolor=#fefefe
| 426413 ||  || — || September 16, 2010 || Kitt Peak || Spacewatch || — || align=right data-sort-value="0.62" | 620 m || 
|-id=414 bgcolor=#fefefe
| 426414 ||  || — || August 28, 2006 || Kitt Peak || Spacewatch || — || align=right data-sort-value="0.62" | 620 m || 
|-id=415 bgcolor=#fefefe
| 426415 ||  || — || December 6, 2010 || Mount Lemmon || Mount Lemmon Survey || — || align=right data-sort-value="0.95" | 950 m || 
|-id=416 bgcolor=#E9E9E9
| 426416 ||  || — || July 28, 2009 || Kitt Peak || Spacewatch || — || align=right data-sort-value="0.73" | 730 m || 
|-id=417 bgcolor=#d6d6d6
| 426417 ||  || — || September 16, 2003 || Kitt Peak || Spacewatch || KOR || align=right | 1.6 km || 
|-id=418 bgcolor=#fefefe
| 426418 ||  || — || November 2, 2006 || Mount Lemmon || Mount Lemmon Survey || V || align=right data-sort-value="0.63" | 630 m || 
|-id=419 bgcolor=#E9E9E9
| 426419 ||  || — || April 10, 2003 || Kitt Peak || Spacewatch || — || align=right | 1.9 km || 
|-id=420 bgcolor=#E9E9E9
| 426420 ||  || — || February 21, 2007 || Mount Lemmon || Mount Lemmon Survey || — || align=right data-sort-value="0.86" | 860 m || 
|-id=421 bgcolor=#fefefe
| 426421 ||  || — || April 2, 2005 || Mount Lemmon || Mount Lemmon Survey || — || align=right data-sort-value="0.67" | 670 m || 
|-id=422 bgcolor=#d6d6d6
| 426422 ||  || — || November 25, 2009 || Kitt Peak || Spacewatch || — || align=right | 3.5 km || 
|-id=423 bgcolor=#fefefe
| 426423 ||  || — || June 1, 2009 || Mount Lemmon || Mount Lemmon Survey || — || align=right data-sort-value="0.94" | 940 m || 
|-id=424 bgcolor=#fefefe
| 426424 ||  || — || September 19, 2003 || Kitt Peak || Spacewatch || — || align=right data-sort-value="0.75" | 750 m || 
|-id=425 bgcolor=#E9E9E9
| 426425 ||  || — || June 7, 2008 || Siding Spring || SSS || — || align=right | 2.9 km || 
|-id=426 bgcolor=#E9E9E9
| 426426 ||  || — || September 28, 2009 || Mount Lemmon || Mount Lemmon Survey || WIT || align=right data-sort-value="0.95" | 950 m || 
|-id=427 bgcolor=#d6d6d6
| 426427 ||  || — || October 26, 2009 || Mount Lemmon || Mount Lemmon Survey || KOR || align=right | 1.4 km || 
|-id=428 bgcolor=#fefefe
| 426428 ||  || — || March 15, 2012 || Kitt Peak || Spacewatch || — || align=right | 1.0 km || 
|-id=429 bgcolor=#E9E9E9
| 426429 ||  || — || January 30, 2006 || Kitt Peak || Spacewatch || — || align=right | 1.6 km || 
|-id=430 bgcolor=#fefefe
| 426430 ||  || — || November 7, 2010 || Mount Lemmon || Mount Lemmon Survey || NYS || align=right data-sort-value="0.89" | 890 m || 
|-id=431 bgcolor=#E9E9E9
| 426431 ||  || — || January 31, 2006 || Kitt Peak || Spacewatch || — || align=right | 2.1 km || 
|-id=432 bgcolor=#E9E9E9
| 426432 ||  || — || September 18, 2009 || Catalina || CSS || — || align=right | 1.8 km || 
|-id=433 bgcolor=#E9E9E9
| 426433 ||  || — || November 13, 2010 || Mount Lemmon || Mount Lemmon Survey || — || align=right | 1.7 km || 
|-id=434 bgcolor=#d6d6d6
| 426434 ||  || — || March 14, 2011 || Mount Lemmon || Mount Lemmon Survey || — || align=right | 2.9 km || 
|-id=435 bgcolor=#E9E9E9
| 426435 ||  || — || November 11, 2009 || Kitt Peak || Spacewatch || — || align=right | 1.9 km || 
|-id=436 bgcolor=#E9E9E9
| 426436 ||  || — || September 10, 2004 || Kitt Peak || Spacewatch || — || align=right | 1.8 km || 
|-id=437 bgcolor=#E9E9E9
| 426437 ||  || — || August 25, 2004 || Kitt Peak || Spacewatch || — || align=right | 1.9 km || 
|-id=438 bgcolor=#fefefe
| 426438 ||  || — || November 19, 2006 || Kitt Peak || Spacewatch || — || align=right data-sort-value="0.76" | 760 m || 
|-id=439 bgcolor=#E9E9E9
| 426439 ||  || — || September 29, 2005 || Catalina || CSS || — || align=right | 2.2 km || 
|-id=440 bgcolor=#d6d6d6
| 426440 ||  || — || September 3, 2008 || Kitt Peak || Spacewatch || — || align=right | 2.1 km || 
|-id=441 bgcolor=#fefefe
| 426441 ||  || — || February 26, 2008 || Kitt Peak || Spacewatch || — || align=right data-sort-value="0.85" | 850 m || 
|-id=442 bgcolor=#E9E9E9
| 426442 ||  || — || October 24, 2009 || Kitt Peak || Spacewatch || — || align=right | 2.9 km || 
|-id=443 bgcolor=#d6d6d6
| 426443 ||  || — || April 9, 2010 || WISE || WISE || — || align=right | 5.0 km || 
|-id=444 bgcolor=#fefefe
| 426444 ||  || — || March 25, 2008 || Kitt Peak || Spacewatch || — || align=right data-sort-value="0.83" | 830 m || 
|-id=445 bgcolor=#d6d6d6
| 426445 ||  || — || January 13, 2005 || Kitt Peak || Spacewatch || — || align=right | 2.9 km || 
|-id=446 bgcolor=#d6d6d6
| 426446 ||  || — || May 12, 2012 || Mount Lemmon || Mount Lemmon Survey || — || align=right | 2.7 km || 
|-id=447 bgcolor=#fefefe
| 426447 ||  || — || September 18, 2006 || Kitt Peak || Spacewatch || — || align=right data-sort-value="0.91" | 910 m || 
|-id=448 bgcolor=#fefefe
| 426448 ||  || — || October 2, 2006 || Mount Lemmon || Mount Lemmon Survey || — || align=right data-sort-value="0.75" | 750 m || 
|-id=449 bgcolor=#d6d6d6
| 426449 ||  || — || March 4, 2011 || Mount Lemmon || Mount Lemmon Survey || — || align=right | 2.4 km || 
|-id=450 bgcolor=#fefefe
| 426450 ||  || — || April 1, 1995 || Kitt Peak || Spacewatch || — || align=right data-sort-value="0.90" | 900 m || 
|-id=451 bgcolor=#E9E9E9
| 426451 ||  || — || August 27, 2009 || Catalina || CSS || — || align=right data-sort-value="0.94" | 940 m || 
|-id=452 bgcolor=#fefefe
| 426452 ||  || — || December 27, 2006 || Mount Lemmon || Mount Lemmon Survey || — || align=right data-sort-value="0.68" | 680 m || 
|-id=453 bgcolor=#E9E9E9
| 426453 ||  || — || October 26, 2005 || Kitt Peak || Spacewatch || — || align=right | 1.3 km || 
|-id=454 bgcolor=#fefefe
| 426454 ||  || — || November 16, 1999 || Kitt Peak || Spacewatch || — || align=right data-sort-value="0.75" | 750 m || 
|-id=455 bgcolor=#fefefe
| 426455 ||  || — || November 22, 2006 || Catalina || CSS || — || align=right data-sort-value="0.91" | 910 m || 
|-id=456 bgcolor=#E9E9E9
| 426456 ||  || — || September 14, 2009 || Catalina || CSS || — || align=right | 2.0 km || 
|-id=457 bgcolor=#E9E9E9
| 426457 ||  || — || October 17, 2009 || Catalina || CSS || — || align=right | 1.7 km || 
|-id=458 bgcolor=#fefefe
| 426458 ||  || — || August 28, 2006 || Anderson Mesa || LONEOS || V || align=right data-sort-value="0.79" | 790 m || 
|-id=459 bgcolor=#E9E9E9
| 426459 ||  || — || November 10, 2009 || Kitt Peak || Spacewatch || — || align=right | 1.9 km || 
|-id=460 bgcolor=#fefefe
| 426460 ||  || — || January 30, 2008 || Kitt Peak || Spacewatch || — || align=right data-sort-value="0.71" | 710 m || 
|-id=461 bgcolor=#fefefe
| 426461 ||  || — || January 17, 2005 || Kitt Peak || Spacewatch || — || align=right data-sort-value="0.68" | 680 m || 
|-id=462 bgcolor=#E9E9E9
| 426462 ||  || — || April 19, 2012 || Mount Lemmon || Mount Lemmon Survey || MAR || align=right | 1.1 km || 
|-id=463 bgcolor=#E9E9E9
| 426463 ||  || — || January 9, 2006 || Kitt Peak || Spacewatch || — || align=right | 2.5 km || 
|-id=464 bgcolor=#E9E9E9
| 426464 ||  || — || November 9, 2009 || Kitt Peak || Spacewatch || — || align=right | 2.3 km || 
|-id=465 bgcolor=#E9E9E9
| 426465 ||  || — || January 28, 2011 || Mount Lemmon || Mount Lemmon Survey || — || align=right | 2.2 km || 
|-id=466 bgcolor=#E9E9E9
| 426466 ||  || — || August 5, 2005 || Siding Spring || SSS || — || align=right | 1.7 km || 
|-id=467 bgcolor=#E9E9E9
| 426467 ||  || — || October 2, 2000 || Socorro || LINEAR || EUN || align=right | 1.3 km || 
|-id=468 bgcolor=#fefefe
| 426468 ||  || — || May 25, 2006 || Kitt Peak || Spacewatch || — || align=right data-sort-value="0.82" | 820 m || 
|-id=469 bgcolor=#E9E9E9
| 426469 ||  || — || September 29, 2009 || Mount Lemmon || Mount Lemmon Survey || JUN || align=right | 1.1 km || 
|-id=470 bgcolor=#fefefe
| 426470 ||  || — || March 27, 2008 || Mount Lemmon || Mount Lemmon Survey || — || align=right | 1.2 km || 
|-id=471 bgcolor=#E9E9E9
| 426471 ||  || — || September 21, 2009 || Kitt Peak || Spacewatch || — || align=right | 1.4 km || 
|-id=472 bgcolor=#fefefe
| 426472 ||  || — || March 13, 2008 || Kitt Peak || Spacewatch || — || align=right | 1.0 km || 
|-id=473 bgcolor=#fefefe
| 426473 ||  || — || May 8, 2006 || Mount Lemmon || Mount Lemmon Survey || — || align=right data-sort-value="0.62" | 620 m || 
|-id=474 bgcolor=#E9E9E9
| 426474 ||  || — || October 30, 2009 || Mount Lemmon || Mount Lemmon Survey || — || align=right | 1.7 km || 
|-id=475 bgcolor=#E9E9E9
| 426475 ||  || — || October 26, 2009 || Kitt Peak || Spacewatch || MIS || align=right | 2.3 km || 
|-id=476 bgcolor=#d6d6d6
| 426476 ||  || — || September 7, 2008 || Mount Lemmon || Mount Lemmon Survey || — || align=right | 2.8 km || 
|-id=477 bgcolor=#E9E9E9
| 426477 ||  || — || October 24, 2009 || Kitt Peak || Spacewatch || — || align=right | 1.1 km || 
|-id=478 bgcolor=#E9E9E9
| 426478 ||  || — || November 30, 2005 || Kitt Peak || Spacewatch || — || align=right | 1.5 km || 
|-id=479 bgcolor=#fefefe
| 426479 ||  || — || October 21, 2007 || Mount Lemmon || Mount Lemmon Survey || — || align=right data-sort-value="0.68" | 680 m || 
|-id=480 bgcolor=#d6d6d6
| 426480 ||  || — || January 30, 2006 || Kitt Peak || Spacewatch || — || align=right | 2.3 km || 
|-id=481 bgcolor=#FA8072
| 426481 ||  || — || October 30, 1999 || Socorro || LINEAR || — || align=right | 1.5 km || 
|-id=482 bgcolor=#E9E9E9
| 426482 ||  || — || December 6, 2005 || Kitt Peak || Spacewatch || — || align=right | 1.1 km || 
|-id=483 bgcolor=#E9E9E9
| 426483 ||  || — || October 27, 2005 || Catalina || CSS || — || align=right | 1.4 km || 
|-id=484 bgcolor=#E9E9E9
| 426484 ||  || — || January 17, 2007 || Kitt Peak || Spacewatch || — || align=right | 1.6 km || 
|-id=485 bgcolor=#fefefe
| 426485 ||  || — || September 30, 2006 || Mount Lemmon || Mount Lemmon Survey || NYS || align=right data-sort-value="0.74" | 740 m || 
|-id=486 bgcolor=#E9E9E9
| 426486 ||  || — || December 6, 1996 || Kitt Peak || Spacewatch || — || align=right | 1.7 km || 
|-id=487 bgcolor=#E9E9E9
| 426487 ||  || — || November 15, 1995 || Kitt Peak || Spacewatch || — || align=right | 2.8 km || 
|-id=488 bgcolor=#E9E9E9
| 426488 ||  || — || March 2, 2006 || Kitt Peak || Spacewatch || — || align=right | 2.0 km || 
|-id=489 bgcolor=#d6d6d6
| 426489 ||  || — || August 21, 2008 || Kitt Peak || Spacewatch || — || align=right | 1.8 km || 
|-id=490 bgcolor=#d6d6d6
| 426490 ||  || — || September 25, 2008 || Kitt Peak || Spacewatch || — || align=right | 2.9 km || 
|-id=491 bgcolor=#fefefe
| 426491 ||  || — || April 11, 2005 || Mount Lemmon || Mount Lemmon Survey || — || align=right data-sort-value="0.68" | 680 m || 
|-id=492 bgcolor=#d6d6d6
| 426492 ||  || — || September 19, 2007 || Mount Lemmon || Mount Lemmon Survey || — || align=right | 3.0 km || 
|-id=493 bgcolor=#E9E9E9
| 426493 ||  || — || March 2, 2011 || Kitt Peak || Spacewatch || — || align=right | 1.5 km || 
|-id=494 bgcolor=#E9E9E9
| 426494 ||  || — || November 8, 2009 || Catalina || CSS || — || align=right | 2.7 km || 
|-id=495 bgcolor=#E9E9E9
| 426495 ||  || — || November 17, 2009 || Mount Lemmon || Mount Lemmon Survey || AGN || align=right | 1.1 km || 
|-id=496 bgcolor=#fefefe
| 426496 ||  || — || July 30, 2009 || Catalina || CSS || — || align=right | 1.1 km || 
|-id=497 bgcolor=#fefefe
| 426497 ||  || — || October 3, 2006 || Mount Lemmon || Mount Lemmon Survey || — || align=right data-sort-value="0.82" | 820 m || 
|-id=498 bgcolor=#fefefe
| 426498 ||  || — || June 14, 2005 || Mount Lemmon || Mount Lemmon Survey || MAS || align=right data-sort-value="0.82" | 820 m || 
|-id=499 bgcolor=#fefefe
| 426499 ||  || — || February 7, 2002 || Kitt Peak || Spacewatch || — || align=right data-sort-value="0.88" | 880 m || 
|-id=500 bgcolor=#E9E9E9
| 426500 ||  || — || October 12, 1999 || Socorro || LINEAR || — || align=right | 3.0 km || 
|}

426501–426600 

|-bgcolor=#fefefe
| 426501 ||  || — || April 1, 2008 || Kitt Peak || Spacewatch || — || align=right | 1.2 km || 
|-id=502 bgcolor=#d6d6d6
| 426502 ||  || — || October 27, 2008 || Mount Lemmon || Mount Lemmon Survey || — || align=right | 3.8 km || 
|-id=503 bgcolor=#E9E9E9
| 426503 ||  || — || May 14, 2012 || Mount Lemmon || Mount Lemmon Survey || — || align=right | 2.6 km || 
|-id=504 bgcolor=#E9E9E9
| 426504 ||  || — || March 10, 2011 || Kitt Peak || Spacewatch || — || align=right | 2.8 km || 
|-id=505 bgcolor=#E9E9E9
| 426505 ||  || — || October 10, 2005 || Kitt Peak || Spacewatch || — || align=right | 1.3 km || 
|-id=506 bgcolor=#d6d6d6
| 426506 ||  || — || September 22, 2008 || Mount Lemmon || Mount Lemmon Survey || — || align=right | 2.7 km || 
|-id=507 bgcolor=#d6d6d6
| 426507 ||  || — || October 4, 2007 || Mount Lemmon || Mount Lemmon Survey || — || align=right | 3.0 km || 
|-id=508 bgcolor=#d6d6d6
| 426508 ||  || — || October 30, 2008 || Kitt Peak || Spacewatch || THM || align=right | 2.2 km || 
|-id=509 bgcolor=#E9E9E9
| 426509 ||  || — || March 1, 2011 || Mount Lemmon || Mount Lemmon Survey || — || align=right | 2.1 km || 
|-id=510 bgcolor=#fefefe
| 426510 ||  || — || February 8, 2008 || Kitt Peak || Spacewatch || NYS || align=right data-sort-value="0.67" | 670 m || 
|-id=511 bgcolor=#E9E9E9
| 426511 ||  || — || October 23, 2009 || Mount Lemmon || Mount Lemmon Survey || — || align=right | 1.7 km || 
|-id=512 bgcolor=#fefefe
| 426512 ||  || — || March 27, 2009 || Mount Lemmon || Mount Lemmon Survey || — || align=right data-sort-value="0.82" | 820 m || 
|-id=513 bgcolor=#d6d6d6
| 426513 ||  || — || March 28, 2010 || WISE || WISE || — || align=right | 3.8 km || 
|-id=514 bgcolor=#E9E9E9
| 426514 ||  || — || September 29, 2009 || Mount Lemmon || Mount Lemmon Survey || — || align=right | 1.1 km || 
|-id=515 bgcolor=#d6d6d6
| 426515 ||  || — || September 6, 2003 || Campo Imperatore || CINEOS || TEL || align=right | 2.0 km || 
|-id=516 bgcolor=#E9E9E9
| 426516 ||  || — || December 25, 2005 || Kitt Peak || Spacewatch || — || align=right | 2.6 km || 
|-id=517 bgcolor=#d6d6d6
| 426517 ||  || — || September 26, 2008 || Kitt Peak || Spacewatch || — || align=right | 2.1 km || 
|-id=518 bgcolor=#E9E9E9
| 426518 ||  || — || August 31, 2005 || Kitt Peak || Spacewatch || — || align=right data-sort-value="0.83" | 830 m || 
|-id=519 bgcolor=#E9E9E9
| 426519 ||  || — || October 26, 2009 || Mount Lemmon || Mount Lemmon Survey || — || align=right | 1.4 km || 
|-id=520 bgcolor=#fefefe
| 426520 ||  || — || December 25, 2010 || Mount Lemmon || Mount Lemmon Survey || — || align=right data-sort-value="0.79" | 790 m || 
|-id=521 bgcolor=#fefefe
| 426521 ||  || — || January 28, 2004 || Kitt Peak || Spacewatch || — || align=right data-sort-value="0.74" | 740 m || 
|-id=522 bgcolor=#E9E9E9
| 426522 ||  || — || January 28, 2011 || Mount Lemmon || Mount Lemmon Survey || — || align=right | 1.3 km || 
|-id=523 bgcolor=#E9E9E9
| 426523 ||  || — || October 1, 2005 || Catalina || CSS || — || align=right data-sort-value="0.91" | 910 m || 
|-id=524 bgcolor=#E9E9E9
| 426524 ||  || — || October 26, 2009 || Mount Lemmon || Mount Lemmon Survey || — || align=right | 2.4 km || 
|-id=525 bgcolor=#d6d6d6
| 426525 ||  || — || August 9, 2013 || Kitt Peak || Spacewatch || — || align=right | 2.5 km || 
|-id=526 bgcolor=#fefefe
| 426526 ||  || — || September 30, 2006 || Catalina || CSS || — || align=right data-sort-value="0.82" | 820 m || 
|-id=527 bgcolor=#E9E9E9
| 426527 ||  || — || December 9, 2001 || Socorro || LINEAR || — || align=right | 2.0 km || 
|-id=528 bgcolor=#d6d6d6
| 426528 ||  || — || April 12, 2010 || WISE || WISE || — || align=right | 3.1 km || 
|-id=529 bgcolor=#d6d6d6
| 426529 ||  || — || March 11, 2005 || Mount Lemmon || Mount Lemmon Survey || VER || align=right | 2.7 km || 
|-id=530 bgcolor=#d6d6d6
| 426530 ||  || — || August 13, 2007 || Socorro || LINEAR || — || align=right | 4.1 km || 
|-id=531 bgcolor=#E9E9E9
| 426531 ||  || — || October 17, 1995 || Kitt Peak || Spacewatch || AGN || align=right | 1.1 km || 
|-id=532 bgcolor=#d6d6d6
| 426532 ||  || — || September 9, 2008 || Catalina || CSS || — || align=right | 3.3 km || 
|-id=533 bgcolor=#E9E9E9
| 426533 ||  || — || September 29, 2005 || Kitt Peak || Spacewatch || — || align=right data-sort-value="0.74" | 740 m || 
|-id=534 bgcolor=#FA8072
| 426534 ||  || — || September 24, 2000 || Anderson Mesa || LONEOS || — || align=right data-sort-value="0.73" | 730 m || 
|-id=535 bgcolor=#fefefe
| 426535 ||  || — || November 20, 2003 || Socorro || LINEAR || — || align=right data-sort-value="0.82" | 820 m || 
|-id=536 bgcolor=#E9E9E9
| 426536 ||  || — || February 25, 2007 || Kitt Peak || Spacewatch || — || align=right | 1.0 km || 
|-id=537 bgcolor=#E9E9E9
| 426537 ||  || — || December 27, 2005 || Kitt Peak || Spacewatch || — || align=right | 2.1 km || 
|-id=538 bgcolor=#E9E9E9
| 426538 ||  || — || October 30, 2005 || Mount Lemmon || Mount Lemmon Survey || — || align=right | 1.1 km || 
|-id=539 bgcolor=#E9E9E9
| 426539 ||  || — || September 15, 2004 || Kitt Peak || Spacewatch || — || align=right | 2.7 km || 
|-id=540 bgcolor=#E9E9E9
| 426540 ||  || — || October 11, 2004 || Kitt Peak || Spacewatch ||  || align=right | 2.6 km || 
|-id=541 bgcolor=#fefefe
| 426541 ||  || — || March 23, 2012 || Mount Lemmon || Mount Lemmon Survey || MAS || align=right data-sort-value="0.71" | 710 m || 
|-id=542 bgcolor=#E9E9E9
| 426542 ||  || — || March 14, 2007 || Mount Lemmon || Mount Lemmon Survey || RAF || align=right data-sort-value="0.66" | 660 m || 
|-id=543 bgcolor=#d6d6d6
| 426543 ||  || — || March 3, 2005 || Kitt Peak || Spacewatch || — || align=right | 2.8 km || 
|-id=544 bgcolor=#d6d6d6
| 426544 ||  || — || September 10, 2007 || Kitt Peak || Spacewatch || — || align=right | 2.6 km || 
|-id=545 bgcolor=#E9E9E9
| 426545 ||  || — || November 25, 2005 || Mount Lemmon || Mount Lemmon Survey || — || align=right | 2.3 km || 
|-id=546 bgcolor=#d6d6d6
| 426546 ||  || — || October 17, 2003 || Kitt Peak || Spacewatch || — || align=right | 2.7 km || 
|-id=547 bgcolor=#E9E9E9
| 426547 ||  || — || February 7, 2011 || Mount Lemmon || Mount Lemmon Survey || (5) || align=right data-sort-value="0.95" | 950 m || 
|-id=548 bgcolor=#E9E9E9
| 426548 ||  || — || November 9, 2004 || Catalina || CSS || GEF || align=right | 1.3 km || 
|-id=549 bgcolor=#E9E9E9
| 426549 ||  || — || March 16, 2007 || Kitt Peak || Spacewatch || WIT || align=right | 1.1 km || 
|-id=550 bgcolor=#d6d6d6
| 426550 ||  || — || April 23, 2010 || WISE || WISE || — || align=right | 4.0 km || 
|-id=551 bgcolor=#E9E9E9
| 426551 ||  || — || March 14, 2007 || Mount Lemmon || Mount Lemmon Survey || — || align=right | 1.8 km || 
|-id=552 bgcolor=#E9E9E9
| 426552 ||  || — || March 12, 2007 || Catalina || CSS || — || align=right | 1.7 km || 
|-id=553 bgcolor=#E9E9E9
| 426553 ||  || — || April 1, 2011 || Mount Lemmon || Mount Lemmon Survey || — || align=right | 2.2 km || 
|-id=554 bgcolor=#E9E9E9
| 426554 ||  || — || January 31, 2006 || Kitt Peak || Spacewatch || — || align=right | 2.0 km || 
|-id=555 bgcolor=#fefefe
| 426555 ||  || — || April 3, 2009 || Mount Lemmon || Mount Lemmon Survey || — || align=right data-sort-value="0.86" | 860 m || 
|-id=556 bgcolor=#E9E9E9
| 426556 ||  || — || January 8, 2006 || Mount Lemmon || Mount Lemmon Survey || AGN || align=right | 1.3 km || 
|-id=557 bgcolor=#E9E9E9
| 426557 ||  || — || July 24, 2000 || Kitt Peak || Spacewatch || — || align=right | 1.1 km || 
|-id=558 bgcolor=#E9E9E9
| 426558 ||  || — || May 13, 2008 || Siding Spring || SSS || — || align=right | 1.5 km || 
|-id=559 bgcolor=#E9E9E9
| 426559 ||  || — || October 15, 1995 || Kitt Peak || Spacewatch || — || align=right | 2.1 km || 
|-id=560 bgcolor=#E9E9E9
| 426560 ||  || — || July 29, 2008 || Kitt Peak || Spacewatch || — || align=right | 2.0 km || 
|-id=561 bgcolor=#d6d6d6
| 426561 ||  || — || September 16, 2003 || Kitt Peak || Spacewatch || KOR || align=right | 1.4 km || 
|-id=562 bgcolor=#d6d6d6
| 426562 ||  || — || December 28, 2003 || Kitt Peak || Spacewatch || — || align=right | 3.0 km || 
|-id=563 bgcolor=#E9E9E9
| 426563 ||  || — || September 14, 2009 || Catalina || CSS || — || align=right | 1.2 km || 
|-id=564 bgcolor=#E9E9E9
| 426564 ||  || — || November 4, 2004 || Catalina || CSS || — || align=right | 2.3 km || 
|-id=565 bgcolor=#fefefe
| 426565 ||  || — || March 8, 2005 || Kitt Peak || Spacewatch || — || align=right data-sort-value="0.84" | 840 m || 
|-id=566 bgcolor=#E9E9E9
| 426566 ||  || — || March 13, 2011 || Kitt Peak || Spacewatch || — || align=right | 2.3 km || 
|-id=567 bgcolor=#d6d6d6
| 426567 ||  || — || August 5, 2003 || Kitt Peak || Spacewatch || EOS || align=right | 2.0 km || 
|-id=568 bgcolor=#E9E9E9
| 426568 ||  || — || December 26, 2006 || Kitt Peak || Spacewatch || ADE || align=right | 2.1 km || 
|-id=569 bgcolor=#fefefe
| 426569 ||  || — || September 17, 2006 || Catalina || CSS || V || align=right data-sort-value="0.74" | 740 m || 
|-id=570 bgcolor=#E9E9E9
| 426570 ||  || — || March 16, 2007 || Mount Lemmon || Mount Lemmon Survey || — || align=right | 1.5 km || 
|-id=571 bgcolor=#E9E9E9
| 426571 ||  || — || September 15, 2009 || Kitt Peak || Spacewatch || (5) || align=right data-sort-value="0.77" | 770 m || 
|-id=572 bgcolor=#E9E9E9
| 426572 ||  || — || September 18, 2009 || Kitt Peak || Spacewatch || (5) || align=right data-sort-value="0.75" | 750 m || 
|-id=573 bgcolor=#d6d6d6
| 426573 ||  || — || May 2, 2006 || Mount Lemmon || Mount Lemmon Survey || — || align=right | 2.8 km || 
|-id=574 bgcolor=#E9E9E9
| 426574 ||  || — || September 20, 2009 || Kitt Peak || Spacewatch || MAR || align=right | 1.1 km || 
|-id=575 bgcolor=#E9E9E9
| 426575 ||  || — || October 26, 2009 || Mount Lemmon || Mount Lemmon Survey || — || align=right | 3.2 km || 
|-id=576 bgcolor=#E9E9E9
| 426576 ||  || — || March 20, 2007 || Mount Lemmon || Mount Lemmon Survey || — || align=right | 2.4 km || 
|-id=577 bgcolor=#E9E9E9
| 426577 ||  || — || April 15, 2007 || Kitt Peak || Spacewatch || — || align=right | 2.9 km || 
|-id=578 bgcolor=#E9E9E9
| 426578 ||  || — || September 8, 2004 || Socorro || LINEAR || — || align=right | 1.4 km || 
|-id=579 bgcolor=#E9E9E9
| 426579 ||  || — || October 1, 2009 || Mount Lemmon || Mount Lemmon Survey || — || align=right | 2.8 km || 
|-id=580 bgcolor=#d6d6d6
| 426580 ||  || — || April 2, 2006 || Kitt Peak || Spacewatch || — || align=right | 2.8 km || 
|-id=581 bgcolor=#E9E9E9
| 426581 ||  || — || February 4, 2006 || Kitt Peak || Spacewatch || GEF || align=right | 1.5 km || 
|-id=582 bgcolor=#E9E9E9
| 426582 ||  || — || September 19, 2009 || Kitt Peak || Spacewatch || — || align=right data-sort-value="0.99" | 990 m || 
|-id=583 bgcolor=#E9E9E9
| 426583 ||  || — || December 20, 2009 || Kitt Peak || Spacewatch || — || align=right | 3.0 km || 
|-id=584 bgcolor=#d6d6d6
| 426584 ||  || — || February 22, 2004 || Kitt Peak || Spacewatch || — || align=right | 3.2 km || 
|-id=585 bgcolor=#fefefe
| 426585 ||  || — || March 5, 2008 || Kitt Peak || Spacewatch || V || align=right data-sort-value="0.65" | 650 m || 
|-id=586 bgcolor=#d6d6d6
| 426586 ||  || — || February 14, 2010 || Kitt Peak || Spacewatch || EOS || align=right | 2.3 km || 
|-id=587 bgcolor=#d6d6d6
| 426587 ||  || — || September 18, 2007 || Anderson Mesa || LONEOS || — || align=right | 4.1 km || 
|-id=588 bgcolor=#fefefe
| 426588 ||  || — || December 4, 2007 || Kitt Peak || Spacewatch || — || align=right data-sort-value="0.99" | 990 m || 
|-id=589 bgcolor=#d6d6d6
| 426589 ||  || — || November 19, 2008 || Kitt Peak || Spacewatch || — || align=right | 4.0 km || 
|-id=590 bgcolor=#E9E9E9
| 426590 ||  || — || March 20, 2007 || Kitt Peak || Spacewatch || — || align=right | 2.3 km || 
|-id=591 bgcolor=#E9E9E9
| 426591 ||  || — || February 22, 2012 || Kitt Peak || Spacewatch || — || align=right | 1.7 km || 
|-id=592 bgcolor=#fefefe
| 426592 ||  || — || March 26, 2006 || Kitt Peak || Spacewatch || — || align=right data-sort-value="0.69" | 690 m || 
|-id=593 bgcolor=#fefefe
| 426593 ||  || — || March 26, 2004 || Kitt Peak || Spacewatch || — || align=right data-sort-value="0.97" | 970 m || 
|-id=594 bgcolor=#d6d6d6
| 426594 ||  || — || February 6, 2006 || Kitt Peak || Spacewatch || — || align=right | 2.7 km || 
|-id=595 bgcolor=#E9E9E9
| 426595 ||  || — || September 15, 2004 || Kitt Peak || Spacewatch || — || align=right | 3.5 km || 
|-id=596 bgcolor=#d6d6d6
| 426596 ||  || — || March 2, 2011 || Mount Lemmon || Mount Lemmon Survey || — || align=right | 3.0 km || 
|-id=597 bgcolor=#fefefe
| 426597 ||  || — || February 2, 2008 || Kitt Peak || Spacewatch || CLA || align=right | 1.4 km || 
|-id=598 bgcolor=#fefefe
| 426598 ||  || — || March 13, 1997 || Kitt Peak || Spacewatch || — || align=right data-sort-value="0.82" | 820 m || 
|-id=599 bgcolor=#E9E9E9
| 426599 ||  || — || January 26, 2006 || Mount Lemmon || Mount Lemmon Survey || — || align=right | 2.3 km || 
|-id=600 bgcolor=#E9E9E9
| 426600 ||  || — || November 20, 2009 || Mount Lemmon || Mount Lemmon Survey || — || align=right | 1.8 km || 
|}

426601–426700 

|-bgcolor=#E9E9E9
| 426601 ||  || — || October 1, 2005 || Kitt Peak || Spacewatch || — || align=right data-sort-value="0.99" | 990 m || 
|-id=602 bgcolor=#E9E9E9
| 426602 ||  || — || February 25, 2011 || Kitt Peak || Spacewatch || — || align=right | 2.8 km || 
|-id=603 bgcolor=#d6d6d6
| 426603 ||  || — || November 20, 2008 || Kitt Peak || Spacewatch || — || align=right | 2.6 km || 
|-id=604 bgcolor=#E9E9E9
| 426604 ||  || — || July 24, 2000 || Kitt Peak || Spacewatch || — || align=right | 1.5 km || 
|-id=605 bgcolor=#E9E9E9
| 426605 ||  || — || September 23, 2004 || Kitt Peak || Spacewatch || — || align=right | 1.9 km || 
|-id=606 bgcolor=#d6d6d6
| 426606 ||  || — || February 19, 2004 || Socorro || LINEAR || Tj (2.98) || align=right | 3.3 km || 
|-id=607 bgcolor=#E9E9E9
| 426607 ||  || — || October 17, 1995 || Kitt Peak || Spacewatch || — || align=right | 2.5 km || 
|-id=608 bgcolor=#fefefe
| 426608 ||  || — || July 18, 2009 || Siding Spring || SSS || — || align=right | 1.3 km || 
|-id=609 bgcolor=#d6d6d6
| 426609 ||  || — || September 12, 2007 || Kitt Peak || Spacewatch || — || align=right | 3.3 km || 
|-id=610 bgcolor=#E9E9E9
| 426610 ||  || — || November 9, 2009 || Catalina || CSS || — || align=right | 1.2 km || 
|-id=611 bgcolor=#fefefe
| 426611 ||  || — || November 9, 2007 || Mount Lemmon || Mount Lemmon Survey || — || align=right data-sort-value="0.55" | 550 m || 
|-id=612 bgcolor=#E9E9E9
| 426612 ||  || — || December 7, 2005 || Kitt Peak || Spacewatch ||  || align=right | 2.0 km || 
|-id=613 bgcolor=#E9E9E9
| 426613 ||  || — || October 15, 2004 || Mount Lemmon || Mount Lemmon Survey || — || align=right | 2.8 km || 
|-id=614 bgcolor=#d6d6d6
| 426614 ||  || — || October 4, 2002 || Campo Imperatore || CINEOS || — || align=right | 2.6 km || 
|-id=615 bgcolor=#fefefe
| 426615 ||  || — || May 11, 1996 || Kitt Peak || Spacewatch || — || align=right data-sort-value="0.83" | 830 m || 
|-id=616 bgcolor=#d6d6d6
| 426616 ||  || — || August 30, 2005 || Kitt Peak || Spacewatch || 3:2 || align=right | 3.9 km || 
|-id=617 bgcolor=#d6d6d6
| 426617 ||  || — || March 4, 2005 || Mount Lemmon || Mount Lemmon Survey || — || align=right | 2.6 km || 
|-id=618 bgcolor=#E9E9E9
| 426618 ||  || — || November 17, 2009 || Kitt Peak || Spacewatch || — || align=right | 3.0 km || 
|-id=619 bgcolor=#d6d6d6
| 426619 ||  || — || January 28, 2004 || Kitt Peak || Spacewatch || THM || align=right | 2.6 km || 
|-id=620 bgcolor=#fefefe
| 426620 ||  || — || March 11, 2008 || Kitt Peak || Spacewatch || — || align=right | 1.0 km || 
|-id=621 bgcolor=#fefefe
| 426621 ||  || — || March 16, 2005 || Catalina || CSS || — || align=right | 1.1 km || 
|-id=622 bgcolor=#E9E9E9
| 426622 ||  || — || October 23, 2009 || Kitt Peak || Spacewatch || — || align=right | 1.5 km || 
|-id=623 bgcolor=#E9E9E9
| 426623 ||  || — || January 27, 2011 || Kitt Peak || Spacewatch || — || align=right | 1.8 km || 
|-id=624 bgcolor=#E9E9E9
| 426624 ||  || — || February 25, 2011 || Mount Lemmon || Mount Lemmon Survey || — || align=right | 1.4 km || 
|-id=625 bgcolor=#fefefe
| 426625 ||  || — || September 19, 2003 || Socorro || LINEAR || — || align=right data-sort-value="0.91" | 910 m || 
|-id=626 bgcolor=#fefefe
| 426626 ||  || — || September 24, 2000 || Socorro || LINEAR || — || align=right data-sort-value="0.83" | 830 m || 
|-id=627 bgcolor=#d6d6d6
| 426627 ||  || — || February 25, 2006 || Mount Lemmon || Mount Lemmon Survey || KOR || align=right | 1.7 km || 
|-id=628 bgcolor=#d6d6d6
| 426628 ||  || — || October 21, 2008 || Kitt Peak || Spacewatch || — || align=right | 3.0 km || 
|-id=629 bgcolor=#fefefe
| 426629 ||  || — || April 20, 2009 || Kitt Peak || Spacewatch || — || align=right data-sort-value="0.67" | 670 m || 
|-id=630 bgcolor=#fefefe
| 426630 ||  || — || February 27, 2008 || Mount Lemmon || Mount Lemmon Survey || — || align=right data-sort-value="0.91" | 910 m || 
|-id=631 bgcolor=#fefefe
| 426631 ||  || — || August 27, 2006 || Anderson Mesa || LONEOS || — || align=right data-sort-value="0.85" | 850 m || 
|-id=632 bgcolor=#E9E9E9
| 426632 ||  || — || September 17, 2009 || Mount Lemmon || Mount Lemmon Survey || — || align=right | 1.3 km || 
|-id=633 bgcolor=#fefefe
| 426633 ||  || — || July 5, 2005 || Siding Spring || SSS || — || align=right | 1.2 km || 
|-id=634 bgcolor=#fefefe
| 426634 ||  || — || August 29, 2006 || Kitt Peak || Spacewatch || — || align=right data-sort-value="0.74" | 740 m || 
|-id=635 bgcolor=#fefefe
| 426635 ||  || — || January 19, 2008 || Mount Lemmon || Mount Lemmon Survey || — || align=right data-sort-value="0.63" | 630 m || 
|-id=636 bgcolor=#E9E9E9
| 426636 ||  || — || November 25, 2005 || Catalina || CSS || (5) || align=right data-sort-value="0.91" | 910 m || 
|-id=637 bgcolor=#E9E9E9
| 426637 ||  || — || March 26, 2007 || Kitt Peak || Spacewatch || — || align=right | 2.3 km || 
|-id=638 bgcolor=#E9E9E9
| 426638 ||  || — || November 1, 2005 || Kitt Peak || Spacewatch || — || align=right data-sort-value="0.68" | 680 m || 
|-id=639 bgcolor=#E9E9E9
| 426639 ||  || — || September 21, 2000 || Anderson Mesa || LONEOS || — || align=right | 1.5 km || 
|-id=640 bgcolor=#d6d6d6
| 426640 ||  || — || March 28, 2011 || Mount Lemmon || Mount Lemmon Survey || — || align=right | 2.8 km || 
|-id=641 bgcolor=#fefefe
| 426641 ||  || — || January 20, 2008 || Kitt Peak || Spacewatch || — || align=right data-sort-value="0.96" | 960 m || 
|-id=642 bgcolor=#d6d6d6
| 426642 ||  || — || February 24, 2006 || Kitt Peak || Spacewatch || — || align=right | 2.4 km || 
|-id=643 bgcolor=#E9E9E9
| 426643 ||  || — || November 17, 2009 || Catalina || CSS || EUN || align=right | 1.4 km || 
|-id=644 bgcolor=#fefefe
| 426644 ||  || — || September 28, 2006 || Kitt Peak || Spacewatch || — || align=right data-sort-value="0.63" | 630 m || 
|-id=645 bgcolor=#E9E9E9
| 426645 ||  || — || March 10, 2007 || Kitt Peak || Spacewatch || (5) || align=right data-sort-value="0.78" | 780 m || 
|-id=646 bgcolor=#d6d6d6
| 426646 ||  || — || August 16, 2002 || Kitt Peak || Spacewatch || — || align=right | 3.6 km || 
|-id=647 bgcolor=#E9E9E9
| 426647 ||  || — || September 29, 1995 || Kitt Peak || Spacewatch || MRX || align=right data-sort-value="0.72" | 720 m || 
|-id=648 bgcolor=#E9E9E9
| 426648 ||  || — || February 2, 2006 || Mount Lemmon || Mount Lemmon Survey || — || align=right | 1.6 km || 
|-id=649 bgcolor=#fefefe
| 426649 ||  || — || January 14, 2008 || Kitt Peak || Spacewatch || — || align=right data-sort-value="0.89" | 890 m || 
|-id=650 bgcolor=#E9E9E9
| 426650 ||  || — || October 15, 2009 || Catalina || CSS || — || align=right | 1.6 km || 
|-id=651 bgcolor=#fefefe
| 426651 ||  || — || August 15, 2009 || Kitt Peak || Spacewatch || — || align=right | 1.1 km || 
|-id=652 bgcolor=#fefefe
| 426652 ||  || — || October 13, 1998 || Kitt Peak || Spacewatch || MAS || align=right data-sort-value="0.79" | 790 m || 
|-id=653 bgcolor=#fefefe
| 426653 ||  || — || June 27, 2006 || Siding Spring || SSS || — || align=right | 1.4 km || 
|-id=654 bgcolor=#d6d6d6
| 426654 ||  || — || September 5, 2007 || Catalina || CSS || (1118) || align=right | 4.7 km || 
|-id=655 bgcolor=#E9E9E9
| 426655 ||  || — || October 23, 2004 || Kitt Peak || Spacewatch || — || align=right | 2.0 km || 
|-id=656 bgcolor=#d6d6d6
| 426656 ||  || — || December 30, 2008 || Catalina || CSS || TIR || align=right | 3.3 km || 
|-id=657 bgcolor=#d6d6d6
| 426657 ||  || — || March 4, 2006 || Mount Lemmon || Mount Lemmon Survey || — || align=right | 2.8 km || 
|-id=658 bgcolor=#E9E9E9
| 426658 ||  || — || November 17, 2000 || Kitt Peak || Spacewatch || — || align=right | 2.6 km || 
|-id=659 bgcolor=#fefefe
| 426659 ||  || — || December 4, 2003 || Socorro || LINEAR || — || align=right | 1.1 km || 
|-id=660 bgcolor=#fefefe
| 426660 ||  || — || December 3, 2010 || Mount Lemmon || Mount Lemmon Survey || — || align=right data-sort-value="0.89" | 890 m || 
|-id=661 bgcolor=#E9E9E9
| 426661 ||  || — || February 21, 2007 || Kitt Peak || Spacewatch ||  || align=right | 1.5 km || 
|-id=662 bgcolor=#E9E9E9
| 426662 ||  || — || November 19, 2009 || Catalina || CSS || — || align=right | 1.9 km || 
|-id=663 bgcolor=#E9E9E9
| 426663 ||  || — || August 3, 2008 || Siding Spring || SSS || — || align=right | 3.6 km || 
|-id=664 bgcolor=#E9E9E9
| 426664 ||  || — || November 20, 2009 || Mount Lemmon || Mount Lemmon Survey || — || align=right | 2.6 km || 
|-id=665 bgcolor=#E9E9E9
| 426665 ||  || — || November 4, 2004 || Kitt Peak || Spacewatch || — || align=right | 2.7 km || 
|-id=666 bgcolor=#E9E9E9
| 426666 ||  || — || October 17, 2009 || Catalina || CSS || — || align=right | 3.2 km || 
|-id=667 bgcolor=#fefefe
| 426667 ||  || — || August 28, 2006 || Kitt Peak || Spacewatch || — || align=right data-sort-value="0.67" | 670 m || 
|-id=668 bgcolor=#fefefe
| 426668 ||  || — || November 11, 2006 || Catalina || CSS || — || align=right | 1.1 km || 
|-id=669 bgcolor=#E9E9E9
| 426669 ||  || — || April 2, 2006 || Kitt Peak || Spacewatch || — || align=right | 2.5 km || 
|-id=670 bgcolor=#E9E9E9
| 426670 ||  || — || January 30, 2006 || Kitt Peak || Spacewatch || HOF || align=right | 2.4 km || 
|-id=671 bgcolor=#fefefe
| 426671 ||  || — || April 18, 2002 || Kitt Peak || Spacewatch || — || align=right data-sort-value="0.77" | 770 m || 
|-id=672 bgcolor=#E9E9E9
| 426672 ||  || — || November 17, 2009 || Mount Lemmon || Mount Lemmon Survey || — || align=right | 1.5 km || 
|-id=673 bgcolor=#E9E9E9
| 426673 ||  || — || March 10, 2011 || Kitt Peak || Spacewatch || — || align=right | 2.2 km || 
|-id=674 bgcolor=#d6d6d6
| 426674 ||  || — || September 10, 2007 || Catalina || CSS || — || align=right | 3.4 km || 
|-id=675 bgcolor=#fefefe
| 426675 ||  || — || July 2, 2005 || Kitt Peak || Spacewatch || — || align=right data-sort-value="0.65" | 650 m || 
|-id=676 bgcolor=#d6d6d6
| 426676 ||  || — || October 9, 2007 || Kitt Peak || Spacewatch || — || align=right | 3.0 km || 
|-id=677 bgcolor=#d6d6d6
| 426677 ||  || — || January 11, 2010 || Kitt Peak || Spacewatch || — || align=right | 2.4 km || 
|-id=678 bgcolor=#fefefe
| 426678 ||  || — || November 25, 2006 || Kitt Peak || Spacewatch || — || align=right data-sort-value="0.99" | 990 m || 
|-id=679 bgcolor=#E9E9E9
| 426679 ||  || — || March 16, 2007 || Kitt Peak || Spacewatch || — || align=right | 2.0 km || 
|-id=680 bgcolor=#E9E9E9
| 426680 ||  || — || October 31, 1999 || Kitt Peak || Spacewatch || — || align=right | 2.0 km || 
|-id=681 bgcolor=#d6d6d6
| 426681 ||  || — || March 24, 2006 || Mount Lemmon || Mount Lemmon Survey || THM || align=right | 3.0 km || 
|-id=682 bgcolor=#fefefe
| 426682 ||  || — || October 20, 2003 || Kitt Peak || Spacewatch || — || align=right data-sort-value="0.86" | 860 m || 
|-id=683 bgcolor=#d6d6d6
| 426683 ||  || — || September 23, 2008 || Kitt Peak || Spacewatch || — || align=right | 2.3 km || 
|-id=684 bgcolor=#d6d6d6
| 426684 ||  || — || November 6, 2008 || Kitt Peak || Spacewatch || — || align=right | 2.7 km || 
|-id=685 bgcolor=#E9E9E9
| 426685 ||  || — || December 3, 2005 || Kitt Peak || Spacewatch || — || align=right | 1.3 km || 
|-id=686 bgcolor=#E9E9E9
| 426686 ||  || — || October 6, 2004 || Kitt Peak || Spacewatch || — || align=right | 1.9 km || 
|-id=687 bgcolor=#E9E9E9
| 426687 ||  || — || January 8, 2006 || Kitt Peak || Spacewatch || AST || align=right | 1.8 km || 
|-id=688 bgcolor=#d6d6d6
| 426688 ||  || — || February 17, 2010 || Kitt Peak || Spacewatch || THM || align=right | 2.2 km || 
|-id=689 bgcolor=#d6d6d6
| 426689 ||  || — || March 9, 2005 || Kitt Peak || Spacewatch || — || align=right | 2.8 km || 
|-id=690 bgcolor=#E9E9E9
| 426690 ||  || — || February 27, 2007 || Kitt Peak || Spacewatch || — || align=right | 1.4 km || 
|-id=691 bgcolor=#E9E9E9
| 426691 ||  || — || October 7, 2004 || Kitt Peak || Spacewatch || — || align=right | 1.8 km || 
|-id=692 bgcolor=#fefefe
| 426692 ||  || — || March 27, 1995 || Kitt Peak || Spacewatch || — || align=right data-sort-value="0.70" | 700 m || 
|-id=693 bgcolor=#d6d6d6
| 426693 ||  || — || May 13, 1996 || Kitt Peak || Spacewatch || EOS || align=right | 1.6 km || 
|-id=694 bgcolor=#d6d6d6
| 426694 ||  || — || August 23, 2008 || Kitt Peak || Spacewatch || KOR || align=right | 1.5 km || 
|-id=695 bgcolor=#E9E9E9
| 426695 ||  || — || November 21, 2009 || Mount Lemmon || Mount Lemmon Survey || — || align=right | 2.6 km || 
|-id=696 bgcolor=#fefefe
| 426696 ||  || — || July 4, 2005 || Kitt Peak || Spacewatch || V || align=right data-sort-value="0.69" | 690 m || 
|-id=697 bgcolor=#E9E9E9
| 426697 ||  || — || September 16, 2003 || Kitt Peak || Spacewatch || AGN || align=right | 1.5 km || 
|-id=698 bgcolor=#fefefe
| 426698 ||  || — || October 18, 2003 || Kitt Peak || Spacewatch || — || align=right data-sort-value="0.79" | 790 m || 
|-id=699 bgcolor=#fefefe
| 426699 ||  || — || January 14, 2008 || Kitt Peak || Spacewatch || — || align=right data-sort-value="0.69" | 690 m || 
|-id=700 bgcolor=#d6d6d6
| 426700 ||  || — || March 9, 2005 || Mount Lemmon || Mount Lemmon Survey || — || align=right | 3.0 km || 
|}

426701–426800 

|-bgcolor=#fefefe
| 426701 ||  || — || November 16, 1998 || Kitt Peak || Spacewatch || — || align=right data-sort-value="0.91" | 910 m || 
|-id=702 bgcolor=#fefefe
| 426702 ||  || — || March 2, 2009 || Kitt Peak || Spacewatch || — || align=right data-sort-value="0.81" | 810 m || 
|-id=703 bgcolor=#E9E9E9
| 426703 ||  || — || October 9, 1999 || Kitt Peak || Spacewatch || — || align=right | 2.5 km || 
|-id=704 bgcolor=#d6d6d6
| 426704 ||  || — || September 18, 2003 || Kitt Peak || Spacewatch || — || align=right | 2.2 km || 
|-id=705 bgcolor=#fefefe
| 426705 ||  || — || September 5, 2010 || Mount Lemmon || Mount Lemmon Survey || — || align=right data-sort-value="0.81" | 810 m || 
|-id=706 bgcolor=#fefefe
| 426706 ||  || — || April 25, 2000 || Kitt Peak || Spacewatch || — || align=right | 1.1 km || 
|-id=707 bgcolor=#d6d6d6
| 426707 ||  || — || January 8, 2010 || WISE || WISE || — || align=right | 2.8 km || 
|-id=708 bgcolor=#E9E9E9
| 426708 ||  || — || January 10, 2006 || Mount Lemmon || Mount Lemmon Survey || — || align=right | 2.0 km || 
|-id=709 bgcolor=#E9E9E9
| 426709 ||  || — || February 21, 2007 || Kitt Peak || Spacewatch || KON || align=right | 2.5 km || 
|-id=710 bgcolor=#E9E9E9
| 426710 ||  || — || October 9, 2004 || Kitt Peak || Spacewatch || — || align=right | 2.4 km || 
|-id=711 bgcolor=#fefefe
| 426711 ||  || — || September 18, 2009 || Kitt Peak || Spacewatch || — || align=right data-sort-value="0.84" | 840 m || 
|-id=712 bgcolor=#E9E9E9
| 426712 ||  || — || October 13, 2004 || Kitt Peak || Spacewatch || — || align=right | 2.2 km || 
|-id=713 bgcolor=#E9E9E9
| 426713 ||  || — || March 21, 2010 || WISE || WISE || HOF || align=right | 3.7 km || 
|-id=714 bgcolor=#E9E9E9
| 426714 ||  || — || September 6, 2008 || Mount Lemmon || Mount Lemmon Survey || DOR || align=right | 2.8 km || 
|-id=715 bgcolor=#fefefe
| 426715 ||  || — || September 13, 1998 || Kitt Peak || Spacewatch || — || align=right data-sort-value="0.78" | 780 m || 
|-id=716 bgcolor=#fefefe
| 426716 ||  || — || October 19, 2003 || Kitt Peak || Spacewatch || — || align=right data-sort-value="0.84" | 840 m || 
|-id=717 bgcolor=#fefefe
| 426717 ||  || — || February 12, 2008 || Kitt Peak || Spacewatch || NYS || align=right data-sort-value="0.76" | 760 m || 
|-id=718 bgcolor=#d6d6d6
| 426718 ||  || — || October 2, 2008 || Kitt Peak || Spacewatch || — || align=right | 2.0 km || 
|-id=719 bgcolor=#E9E9E9
| 426719 ||  || — || March 11, 2007 || Mount Lemmon || Mount Lemmon Survey || — || align=right | 1.3 km || 
|-id=720 bgcolor=#E9E9E9
| 426720 ||  || — || December 11, 2004 || Kitt Peak || Spacewatch || — || align=right | 2.2 km || 
|-id=721 bgcolor=#d6d6d6
| 426721 ||  || — || September 28, 2008 || Mount Lemmon || Mount Lemmon Survey || — || align=right | 3.0 km || 
|-id=722 bgcolor=#E9E9E9
| 426722 ||  || — || October 1, 2000 || Socorro || LINEAR || — || align=right | 1.7 km || 
|-id=723 bgcolor=#C2FFFF
| 426723 ||  || — || September 29, 2013 || XuYi || PMO NEO || L5 || align=right | 8.6 km || 
|-id=724 bgcolor=#d6d6d6
| 426724 ||  || — || September 9, 2008 || Mount Lemmon || Mount Lemmon Survey || — || align=right | 2.0 km || 
|-id=725 bgcolor=#E9E9E9
| 426725 ||  || — || August 23, 2008 || Siding Spring || SSS || DOR || align=right | 2.5 km || 
|-id=726 bgcolor=#E9E9E9
| 426726 ||  || — || March 14, 2007 || Mount Lemmon || Mount Lemmon Survey || EUN || align=right | 1.5 km || 
|-id=727 bgcolor=#d6d6d6
| 426727 ||  || — || June 12, 2012 || Kitt Peak || Spacewatch || VER || align=right | 3.6 km || 
|-id=728 bgcolor=#E9E9E9
| 426728 ||  || — || September 16, 2004 || Anderson Mesa || LONEOS || — || align=right | 1.6 km || 
|-id=729 bgcolor=#E9E9E9
| 426729 ||  || — || March 10, 2007 || Kitt Peak || Spacewatch || — || align=right | 3.0 km || 
|-id=730 bgcolor=#d6d6d6
| 426730 ||  || — || November 7, 2008 || Kitt Peak || Spacewatch || — || align=right | 2.8 km || 
|-id=731 bgcolor=#d6d6d6
| 426731 ||  || — || September 12, 2007 || Mount Lemmon || Mount Lemmon Survey || — || align=right | 2.7 km || 
|-id=732 bgcolor=#d6d6d6
| 426732 ||  || — || January 16, 2004 || Anderson Mesa || LONEOS || — || align=right | 3.5 km || 
|-id=733 bgcolor=#E9E9E9
| 426733 ||  || — || December 4, 2005 || Kitt Peak || Spacewatch || — || align=right | 1.3 km || 
|-id=734 bgcolor=#E9E9E9
| 426734 ||  || — || December 29, 2005 || Socorro || LINEAR || — || align=right | 2.3 km || 
|-id=735 bgcolor=#E9E9E9
| 426735 ||  || — || October 7, 2004 || Kitt Peak || Spacewatch || — || align=right | 2.5 km || 
|-id=736 bgcolor=#fefefe
| 426736 ||  || — || November 18, 2006 || Kitt Peak || Spacewatch || — || align=right data-sort-value="0.91" | 910 m || 
|-id=737 bgcolor=#E9E9E9
| 426737 ||  || — || March 30, 2011 || Mount Lemmon || Mount Lemmon Survey || AGN || align=right | 1.5 km || 
|-id=738 bgcolor=#d6d6d6
| 426738 ||  || — || October 30, 2007 || Mount Lemmon || Mount Lemmon Survey || 7:4 || align=right | 3.8 km || 
|-id=739 bgcolor=#d6d6d6
| 426739 ||  || — || October 14, 2007 || Mount Lemmon || Mount Lemmon Survey || — || align=right | 2.7 km || 
|-id=740 bgcolor=#fefefe
| 426740 ||  || — || November 6, 2010 || Mount Lemmon || Mount Lemmon Survey || — || align=right data-sort-value="0.63" | 630 m || 
|-id=741 bgcolor=#E9E9E9
| 426741 ||  || — || December 25, 2005 || Kitt Peak || Spacewatch ||  || align=right | 1.4 km || 
|-id=742 bgcolor=#fefefe
| 426742 ||  || — || November 2, 2010 || Kitt Peak || Spacewatch || — || align=right data-sort-value="0.73" | 730 m || 
|-id=743 bgcolor=#E9E9E9
| 426743 ||  || — || November 26, 2005 || Kitt Peak || Spacewatch || — || align=right | 1.6 km || 
|-id=744 bgcolor=#E9E9E9
| 426744 ||  || — || February 1, 2006 || Mount Lemmon || Mount Lemmon Survey || — || align=right | 2.2 km || 
|-id=745 bgcolor=#E9E9E9
| 426745 ||  || — || January 31, 2006 || Kitt Peak || Spacewatch || — || align=right | 2.0 km || 
|-id=746 bgcolor=#d6d6d6
| 426746 ||  || — || March 10, 2005 || Mount Lemmon || Mount Lemmon Survey || — || align=right | 2.7 km || 
|-id=747 bgcolor=#E9E9E9
| 426747 ||  || — || October 10, 2004 || Kitt Peak || Spacewatch || — || align=right | 2.2 km || 
|-id=748 bgcolor=#E9E9E9
| 426748 ||  || — || January 23, 2006 || Kitt Peak || Spacewatch || — || align=right | 2.6 km || 
|-id=749 bgcolor=#fefefe
| 426749 ||  || — || November 9, 2007 || Kitt Peak || Spacewatch || — || align=right data-sort-value="0.70" | 700 m || 
|-id=750 bgcolor=#d6d6d6
| 426750 ||  || — || September 15, 2013 || Mount Lemmon || Mount Lemmon Survey || THM || align=right | 2.1 km || 
|-id=751 bgcolor=#E9E9E9
| 426751 ||  || — || October 16, 2009 || Catalina || CSS || — || align=right | 2.3 km || 
|-id=752 bgcolor=#E9E9E9
| 426752 ||  || — || October 5, 2004 || Kitt Peak || Spacewatch || — || align=right | 1.4 km || 
|-id=753 bgcolor=#E9E9E9
| 426753 ||  || — || September 15, 2004 || Kitt Peak || Spacewatch || — || align=right | 2.5 km || 
|-id=754 bgcolor=#E9E9E9
| 426754 ||  || — || March 29, 2011 || Kitt Peak || Spacewatch || — || align=right | 2.0 km || 
|-id=755 bgcolor=#d6d6d6
| 426755 ||  || — || September 12, 2007 || Mount Lemmon || Mount Lemmon Survey || — || align=right | 3.2 km || 
|-id=756 bgcolor=#E9E9E9
| 426756 ||  || — || December 16, 2009 || Mount Lemmon || Mount Lemmon Survey || — || align=right | 2.7 km || 
|-id=757 bgcolor=#d6d6d6
| 426757 ||  || — || May 8, 2005 || Mount Lemmon || Mount Lemmon Survey || — || align=right | 4.0 km || 
|-id=758 bgcolor=#E9E9E9
| 426758 ||  || — || January 27, 2007 || Kitt Peak || Spacewatch || — || align=right | 1.3 km || 
|-id=759 bgcolor=#d6d6d6
| 426759 ||  || — || February 9, 2010 || Kitt Peak || Spacewatch || — || align=right | 2.7 km || 
|-id=760 bgcolor=#fefefe
| 426760 ||  || — || September 8, 2000 || Kitt Peak || Spacewatch || — || align=right data-sort-value="0.83" | 830 m || 
|-id=761 bgcolor=#d6d6d6
| 426761 ||  || — || March 29, 2004 || Kitt Peak || Spacewatch || — || align=right | 3.3 km || 
|-id=762 bgcolor=#d6d6d6
| 426762 ||  || — || March 16, 2010 || Mount Lemmon || Mount Lemmon Survey || 7:4 || align=right | 3.8 km || 
|-id=763 bgcolor=#E9E9E9
| 426763 ||  || — || February 13, 2010 || Catalina || CSS || — || align=right | 2.7 km || 
|-id=764 bgcolor=#d6d6d6
| 426764 ||  || — || September 19, 2007 || Kitt Peak || Spacewatch || — || align=right | 3.2 km || 
|-id=765 bgcolor=#fefefe
| 426765 ||  || — || February 26, 2012 || Kitt Peak || Spacewatch || — || align=right data-sort-value="0.76" | 760 m || 
|-id=766 bgcolor=#E9E9E9
| 426766 ||  || — || September 30, 2005 || Mount Lemmon || Mount Lemmon Survey || — || align=right data-sort-value="0.95" | 950 m || 
|-id=767 bgcolor=#E9E9E9
| 426767 ||  || — || August 21, 2008 || Kitt Peak || Spacewatch || — || align=right | 2.0 km || 
|-id=768 bgcolor=#E9E9E9
| 426768 ||  || — || September 3, 2008 || Kitt Peak || Spacewatch || — || align=right | 2.5 km || 
|-id=769 bgcolor=#d6d6d6
| 426769 ||  || — || October 15, 2007 || Mount Lemmon || Mount Lemmon Survey || — || align=right | 3.1 km || 
|-id=770 bgcolor=#E9E9E9
| 426770 ||  || — || November 9, 2009 || Kitt Peak || Spacewatch || EUN || align=right | 1.1 km || 
|-id=771 bgcolor=#E9E9E9
| 426771 ||  || — || November 1, 2005 || Mount Lemmon || Mount Lemmon Survey || — || align=right data-sort-value="0.84" | 840 m || 
|-id=772 bgcolor=#E9E9E9
| 426772 ||  || — || September 7, 2008 || Mount Lemmon || Mount Lemmon Survey || HOF || align=right | 2.6 km || 
|-id=773 bgcolor=#E9E9E9
| 426773 ||  || — || September 7, 2008 || Mount Lemmon || Mount Lemmon Survey || — || align=right | 2.1 km || 
|-id=774 bgcolor=#d6d6d6
| 426774 ||  || — || September 30, 2003 || Kitt Peak || Spacewatch || KOR || align=right | 1.6 km || 
|-id=775 bgcolor=#E9E9E9
| 426775 ||  || — || October 14, 2004 || Kitt Peak || Spacewatch || — || align=right | 2.5 km || 
|-id=776 bgcolor=#fefefe
| 426776 ||  || — || September 23, 1998 || Kitt Peak || Spacewatch || — || align=right data-sort-value="0.99" | 990 m || 
|-id=777 bgcolor=#d6d6d6
| 426777 ||  || — || September 30, 2008 || Mount Lemmon || Mount Lemmon Survey || — || align=right | 4.6 km || 
|-id=778 bgcolor=#E9E9E9
| 426778 ||  || — || October 26, 2005 || Kitt Peak || Spacewatch || — || align=right | 1.2 km || 
|-id=779 bgcolor=#E9E9E9
| 426779 ||  || — || October 20, 1995 || Kitt Peak || Spacewatch || — || align=right | 2.2 km || 
|-id=780 bgcolor=#fefefe
| 426780 ||  || — || April 11, 2012 || Mount Lemmon || Mount Lemmon Survey || — || align=right | 1.1 km || 
|-id=781 bgcolor=#d6d6d6
| 426781 ||  || — || April 17, 2005 || Kitt Peak || Spacewatch || — || align=right | 3.4 km || 
|-id=782 bgcolor=#E9E9E9
| 426782 ||  || — || February 3, 2006 || Kitt Peak || Spacewatch || NEM || align=right | 2.6 km || 
|-id=783 bgcolor=#fefefe
| 426783 ||  || — || September 18, 2006 || Catalina || CSS || — || align=right data-sort-value="0.72" | 720 m || 
|-id=784 bgcolor=#d6d6d6
| 426784 ||  || — || August 27, 2001 || Kitt Peak || Spacewatch || — || align=right | 2.2 km || 
|-id=785 bgcolor=#E9E9E9
| 426785 ||  || — || September 22, 2004 || Kitt Peak || Spacewatch || MRX || align=right data-sort-value="0.97" | 970 m || 
|-id=786 bgcolor=#d6d6d6
| 426786 ||  || — || September 8, 1999 || Kitt Peak || Spacewatch || SYL7:4 || align=right | 3.8 km || 
|-id=787 bgcolor=#d6d6d6
| 426787 ||  || — || April 29, 2010 || WISE || WISE || — || align=right | 3.7 km || 
|-id=788 bgcolor=#d6d6d6
| 426788 ||  || — || April 26, 2006 || Kitt Peak || Spacewatch || — || align=right | 3.6 km || 
|-id=789 bgcolor=#d6d6d6
| 426789 ||  || — || February 2, 2005 || Kitt Peak || Spacewatch || — || align=right | 3.1 km || 
|-id=790 bgcolor=#d6d6d6
| 426790 ||  || — || September 12, 2001 || Socorro || LINEAR || — || align=right | 3.5 km || 
|-id=791 bgcolor=#d6d6d6
| 426791 ||  || — || October 12, 2007 || Mount Lemmon || Mount Lemmon Survey || — || align=right | 4.0 km || 
|-id=792 bgcolor=#d6d6d6
| 426792 ||  || — || September 30, 1997 || Kitt Peak || Spacewatch || — || align=right | 3.4 km || 
|-id=793 bgcolor=#E9E9E9
| 426793 ||  || — || October 28, 2005 || Catalina || CSS || — || align=right data-sort-value="0.90" | 900 m || 
|-id=794 bgcolor=#fefefe
| 426794 ||  || — || March 6, 2008 || Mount Lemmon || Mount Lemmon Survey || — || align=right data-sort-value="0.94" | 940 m || 
|-id=795 bgcolor=#d6d6d6
| 426795 ||  || — || March 14, 2010 || Mount Lemmon || Mount Lemmon Survey || — || align=right | 3.0 km || 
|-id=796 bgcolor=#d6d6d6
| 426796 ||  || — || September 18, 2007 || Catalina || CSS || — || align=right | 3.9 km || 
|-id=797 bgcolor=#E9E9E9
| 426797 ||  || — || November 20, 2009 || Mount Lemmon || Mount Lemmon Survey || — || align=right | 2.5 km || 
|-id=798 bgcolor=#d6d6d6
| 426798 ||  || — || November 6, 2008 || Mount Lemmon || Mount Lemmon Survey || — || align=right | 2.5 km || 
|-id=799 bgcolor=#d6d6d6
| 426799 ||  || — || March 30, 2000 || Kitt Peak || Spacewatch || — || align=right | 3.1 km || 
|-id=800 bgcolor=#d6d6d6
| 426800 ||  || — || May 4, 2010 || WISE || WISE || — || align=right | 3.1 km || 
|}

426801–426900 

|-bgcolor=#fefefe
| 426801 ||  || — || December 9, 2006 || Kitt Peak || Spacewatch || — || align=right data-sort-value="0.82" | 820 m || 
|-id=802 bgcolor=#d6d6d6
| 426802 ||  || — || September 11, 2007 || Kitt Peak || Spacewatch || — || align=right | 3.1 km || 
|-id=803 bgcolor=#E9E9E9
| 426803 ||  || — || September 10, 2008 || Siding Spring || SSS || — || align=right | 3.4 km || 
|-id=804 bgcolor=#d6d6d6
| 426804 ||  || — || December 24, 1998 || Kitt Peak || Spacewatch || — || align=right | 3.0 km || 
|-id=805 bgcolor=#d6d6d6
| 426805 ||  || — || November 1, 2008 || Mount Lemmon || Mount Lemmon Survey || HYG || align=right | 2.9 km || 
|-id=806 bgcolor=#d6d6d6
| 426806 ||  || — || September 11, 2007 || Mount Lemmon || Mount Lemmon Survey || — || align=right | 2.8 km || 
|-id=807 bgcolor=#E9E9E9
| 426807 ||  || — || March 26, 2010 || WISE || WISE || HOF || align=right | 2.9 km || 
|-id=808 bgcolor=#E9E9E9
| 426808 ||  || — || March 1, 2011 || Mount Lemmon || Mount Lemmon Survey || AGN || align=right | 1.1 km || 
|-id=809 bgcolor=#E9E9E9
| 426809 ||  || — || November 19, 2000 || Kitt Peak || Spacewatch || — || align=right | 3.2 km || 
|-id=810 bgcolor=#E9E9E9
| 426810 ||  || — || February 23, 2007 || Kitt Peak || Spacewatch || — || align=right | 1.3 km || 
|-id=811 bgcolor=#E9E9E9
| 426811 ||  || — || April 15, 2007 || Kitt Peak || Spacewatch || — || align=right | 1.7 km || 
|-id=812 bgcolor=#d6d6d6
| 426812 ||  || — || September 14, 2007 || Kitt Peak || Spacewatch || — || align=right | 2.9 km || 
|-id=813 bgcolor=#d6d6d6
| 426813 ||  || — || September 19, 2008 || Kitt Peak || Spacewatch || KOR || align=right | 1.5 km || 
|-id=814 bgcolor=#E9E9E9
| 426814 ||  || — || October 7, 2005 || Kitt Peak || Spacewatch || — || align=right | 1.0 km || 
|-id=815 bgcolor=#fefefe
| 426815 ||  || — || March 31, 2009 || Kitt Peak || Spacewatch || critical || align=right data-sort-value="0.78" | 780 m || 
|-id=816 bgcolor=#E9E9E9
| 426816 ||  || — || October 7, 2005 || Mount Lemmon || Mount Lemmon Survey || — || align=right | 2.4 km || 
|-id=817 bgcolor=#fefefe
| 426817 ||  || — || September 23, 2000 || Anderson Mesa || LONEOS || — || align=right data-sort-value="0.95" | 950 m || 
|-id=818 bgcolor=#E9E9E9
| 426818 ||  || — || August 22, 2004 || Siding Spring || SSS || — || align=right | 1.3 km || 
|-id=819 bgcolor=#d6d6d6
| 426819 ||  || — || September 11, 2007 || Mount Lemmon || Mount Lemmon Survey || — || align=right | 2.7 km || 
|-id=820 bgcolor=#E9E9E9
| 426820 ||  || — || December 10, 2004 || Socorro || LINEAR || — || align=right | 3.3 km || 
|-id=821 bgcolor=#E9E9E9
| 426821 ||  || — || October 24, 2009 || Kitt Peak || Spacewatch || — || align=right | 1.7 km || 
|-id=822 bgcolor=#d6d6d6
| 426822 ||  || — || August 18, 2007 || XuYi || PMO NEO || — || align=right | 3.8 km || 
|-id=823 bgcolor=#E9E9E9
| 426823 ||  || — || November 28, 2005 || Kitt Peak || Spacewatch || — || align=right | 1.3 km || 
|-id=824 bgcolor=#E9E9E9
| 426824 ||  || — || March 25, 2007 || Mount Lemmon || Mount Lemmon Survey || — || align=right | 2.8 km || 
|-id=825 bgcolor=#d6d6d6
| 426825 ||  || — || August 24, 2007 || Kitt Peak || Spacewatch || — || align=right | 2.8 km || 
|-id=826 bgcolor=#E9E9E9
| 426826 ||  || — || November 3, 2005 || Mount Lemmon || Mount Lemmon Survey || — || align=right | 1.3 km || 
|-id=827 bgcolor=#E9E9E9
| 426827 ||  || — || August 26, 2000 || Socorro || LINEAR || — || align=right | 1.7 km || 
|-id=828 bgcolor=#E9E9E9
| 426828 ||  || — || January 9, 2006 || Kitt Peak || Spacewatch || — || align=right | 1.7 km || 
|-id=829 bgcolor=#fefefe
| 426829 ||  || — || October 29, 2003 || Kitt Peak || Spacewatch || — || align=right data-sort-value="0.95" | 950 m || 
|-id=830 bgcolor=#d6d6d6
| 426830 ||  || — || June 23, 2010 || WISE || WISE || — || align=right | 3.3 km || 
|-id=831 bgcolor=#E9E9E9
| 426831 ||  || — || October 24, 2009 || Catalina || CSS || — || align=right | 1.4 km || 
|-id=832 bgcolor=#d6d6d6
| 426832 ||  || — || October 7, 2007 || Catalina || CSS || — || align=right | 3.9 km || 
|-id=833 bgcolor=#d6d6d6
| 426833 ||  || — || October 8, 2007 || Catalina || CSS || — || align=right | 3.7 km || 
|-id=834 bgcolor=#d6d6d6
| 426834 ||  || — || June 12, 2010 || WISE || WISE || — || align=right | 3.4 km || 
|-id=835 bgcolor=#d6d6d6
| 426835 ||  || — || November 21, 2008 || Kitt Peak || Spacewatch || — || align=right | 3.1 km || 
|-id=836 bgcolor=#d6d6d6
| 426836 ||  || — || February 13, 2010 || Kitt Peak || Spacewatch || EOS || align=right | 2.2 km || 
|-id=837 bgcolor=#d6d6d6
| 426837 ||  || — || September 10, 2007 || Mount Lemmon || Mount Lemmon Survey || EOS || align=right | 2.2 km || 
|-id=838 bgcolor=#E9E9E9
| 426838 ||  || — || November 10, 2004 || Kitt Peak || Spacewatch || HOF || align=right | 2.8 km || 
|-id=839 bgcolor=#d6d6d6
| 426839 ||  || — || March 10, 2005 || Anderson Mesa || LONEOS || EOS || align=right | 2.2 km || 
|-id=840 bgcolor=#d6d6d6
| 426840 ||  || — || August 24, 2007 || Kitt Peak || Spacewatch || — || align=right | 2.5 km || 
|-id=841 bgcolor=#E9E9E9
| 426841 ||  || — || April 2, 2006 || Mount Lemmon || Mount Lemmon Survey || — || align=right | 2.5 km || 
|-id=842 bgcolor=#E9E9E9
| 426842 ||  || — || May 13, 2008 || Mount Lemmon || Mount Lemmon Survey || — || align=right | 1.0 km || 
|-id=843 bgcolor=#E9E9E9
| 426843 ||  || — || October 26, 2009 || Kitt Peak || Spacewatch || — || align=right | 1.1 km || 
|-id=844 bgcolor=#E9E9E9
| 426844 ||  || — || November 10, 2001 || Socorro || LINEAR || — || align=right | 1.1 km || 
|-id=845 bgcolor=#d6d6d6
| 426845 ||  || — || October 11, 2007 || Mount Lemmon || Mount Lemmon Survey || — || align=right | 3.9 km || 
|-id=846 bgcolor=#E9E9E9
| 426846 ||  || — || July 30, 2008 || Mount Lemmon || Mount Lemmon Survey || — || align=right | 1.5 km || 
|-id=847 bgcolor=#E9E9E9
| 426847 ||  || — || December 11, 2009 || Mount Lemmon || Mount Lemmon Survey || RAF || align=right | 1.1 km || 
|-id=848 bgcolor=#d6d6d6
| 426848 ||  || — || February 12, 2004 || Kitt Peak || Spacewatch || — || align=right | 2.8 km || 
|-id=849 bgcolor=#d6d6d6
| 426849 ||  || — || April 7, 2011 || Kitt Peak || Spacewatch || — || align=right | 3.3 km || 
|-id=850 bgcolor=#E9E9E9
| 426850 ||  || — || August 4, 2008 || Siding Spring || SSS || — || align=right | 2.8 km || 
|-id=851 bgcolor=#d6d6d6
| 426851 ||  || — || September 13, 2007 || Kitt Peak || Spacewatch || — || align=right | 3.4 km || 
|-id=852 bgcolor=#d6d6d6
| 426852 ||  || — || December 1, 2003 || Socorro || LINEAR || — || align=right | 3.3 km || 
|-id=853 bgcolor=#d6d6d6
| 426853 ||  || — || October 24, 2008 || Kitt Peak || Spacewatch || — || align=right | 2.9 km || 
|-id=854 bgcolor=#d6d6d6
| 426854 ||  || — || October 26, 2008 || Mount Lemmon || Mount Lemmon Survey || — || align=right | 2.9 km || 
|-id=855 bgcolor=#d6d6d6
| 426855 ||  || — || December 21, 2003 || Kitt Peak || Spacewatch || — || align=right | 4.3 km || 
|-id=856 bgcolor=#d6d6d6
| 426856 ||  || — || September 13, 2007 || Catalina || CSS || — || align=right | 3.3 km || 
|-id=857 bgcolor=#d6d6d6
| 426857 ||  || — || September 3, 2007 || Mount Lemmon || Mount Lemmon Survey || — || align=right | 3.4 km || 
|-id=858 bgcolor=#d6d6d6
| 426858 ||  || — || November 8, 1996 || Kitt Peak || Spacewatch || — || align=right | 2.8 km || 
|-id=859 bgcolor=#d6d6d6
| 426859 ||  || — || May 4, 2005 || Mount Lemmon || Mount Lemmon Survey || — || align=right | 4.0 km || 
|-id=860 bgcolor=#E9E9E9
| 426860 ||  || — || November 6, 1999 || Socorro || LINEAR || — || align=right | 3.1 km || 
|-id=861 bgcolor=#d6d6d6
| 426861 ||  || — || September 10, 2007 || Kitt Peak || Spacewatch || — || align=right | 3.0 km || 
|-id=862 bgcolor=#d6d6d6
| 426862 ||  || — || June 8, 2011 || Mount Lemmon || Mount Lemmon Survey || EOS || align=right | 2.5 km || 
|-id=863 bgcolor=#d6d6d6
| 426863 ||  || — || February 2, 2009 || Mount Lemmon || Mount Lemmon Survey || VER || align=right | 3.0 km || 
|-id=864 bgcolor=#E9E9E9
| 426864 ||  || — || December 12, 2004 || Kitt Peak || Spacewatch || — || align=right | 2.9 km || 
|-id=865 bgcolor=#d6d6d6
| 426865 ||  || — || November 2, 2008 || Mount Lemmon || Mount Lemmon Survey || — || align=right | 3.6 km || 
|-id=866 bgcolor=#E9E9E9
| 426866 ||  || — || December 26, 2005 || Kitt Peak || Spacewatch || — || align=right | 1.1 km || 
|-id=867 bgcolor=#d6d6d6
| 426867 ||  || — || October 16, 2007 || Mount Lemmon || Mount Lemmon Survey || — || align=right | 4.3 km || 
|-id=868 bgcolor=#E9E9E9
| 426868 ||  || — || December 25, 2005 || Mount Lemmon || Mount Lemmon Survey || — || align=right | 1.3 km || 
|-id=869 bgcolor=#d6d6d6
| 426869 ||  || — || May 9, 2005 || Kitt Peak || Spacewatch || — || align=right | 3.8 km || 
|-id=870 bgcolor=#d6d6d6
| 426870 ||  || — || December 31, 2008 || Mount Lemmon || Mount Lemmon Survey || EOS || align=right | 2.3 km || 
|-id=871 bgcolor=#E9E9E9
| 426871 ||  || — || January 14, 2011 || Mount Lemmon || Mount Lemmon Survey || — || align=right | 2.8 km || 
|-id=872 bgcolor=#d6d6d6
| 426872 ||  || — || June 14, 2007 || Kitt Peak || Spacewatch || — || align=right | 4.0 km || 
|-id=873 bgcolor=#E9E9E9
| 426873 ||  || — || December 11, 2004 || Campo Imperatore || CINEOS || — || align=right | 2.6 km || 
|-id=874 bgcolor=#E9E9E9
| 426874 ||  || — || October 21, 1995 || Kitt Peak || Spacewatch || — || align=right | 1.5 km || 
|-id=875 bgcolor=#E9E9E9
| 426875 ||  || — || October 5, 2004 || Kitt Peak || Spacewatch || — || align=right | 1.4 km || 
|-id=876 bgcolor=#E9E9E9
| 426876 ||  || — || December 27, 2006 || Mount Lemmon || Mount Lemmon Survey || — || align=right | 1.4 km || 
|-id=877 bgcolor=#d6d6d6
| 426877 ||  || — || December 21, 2008 || Kitt Peak || Spacewatch || — || align=right | 3.2 km || 
|-id=878 bgcolor=#d6d6d6
| 426878 ||  || — || January 5, 2003 || Socorro || LINEAR || — || align=right | 3.7 km || 
|-id=879 bgcolor=#d6d6d6
| 426879 ||  || — || September 22, 2006 || Catalina || CSS || 7:4 || align=right | 4.1 km || 
|-id=880 bgcolor=#E9E9E9
| 426880 ||  || — || September 7, 2008 || Mount Lemmon || Mount Lemmon Survey || — || align=right | 2.0 km || 
|-id=881 bgcolor=#d6d6d6
| 426881 ||  || — || April 18, 2005 || Kitt Peak || Spacewatch || — || align=right | 3.8 km || 
|-id=882 bgcolor=#E9E9E9
| 426882 ||  || — || January 26, 2006 || Kitt Peak || Spacewatch || AGN || align=right | 1.6 km || 
|-id=883 bgcolor=#fefefe
| 426883 ||  || — || September 14, 1998 || Socorro || LINEAR || — || align=right | 1.1 km || 
|-id=884 bgcolor=#d6d6d6
| 426884 ||  || — || February 17, 2010 || Mount Lemmon || Mount Lemmon Survey || EOS || align=right | 2.2 km || 
|-id=885 bgcolor=#E9E9E9
| 426885 ||  || — || June 29, 2008 || Siding Spring || SSS || — || align=right | 1.6 km || 
|-id=886 bgcolor=#d6d6d6
| 426886 ||  || — || February 22, 2004 || Kitt Peak || Spacewatch || — || align=right | 2.9 km || 
|-id=887 bgcolor=#d6d6d6
| 426887 ||  || — || September 19, 2001 || Socorro || LINEAR || — || align=right | 3.8 km || 
|-id=888 bgcolor=#d6d6d6
| 426888 ||  || — || September 3, 2007 || Catalina || CSS || — || align=right | 3.5 km || 
|-id=889 bgcolor=#d6d6d6
| 426889 ||  || — || December 31, 2008 || Kitt Peak || Spacewatch || — || align=right | 3.2 km || 
|-id=890 bgcolor=#E9E9E9
| 426890 ||  || — || December 13, 1999 || Kitt Peak || Spacewatch || — || align=right | 3.0 km || 
|-id=891 bgcolor=#d6d6d6
| 426891 ||  || — || March 19, 2010 || Mount Lemmon || Mount Lemmon Survey || — || align=right | 3.7 km || 
|-id=892 bgcolor=#E9E9E9
| 426892 ||  || — || August 5, 2008 || Siding Spring || SSS || — || align=right | 2.7 km || 
|-id=893 bgcolor=#E9E9E9
| 426893 ||  || — || December 8, 1999 || Kitt Peak || Spacewatch || — || align=right | 2.5 km || 
|-id=894 bgcolor=#E9E9E9
| 426894 ||  || — || November 21, 2009 || Mount Lemmon || Mount Lemmon Survey || WIT || align=right data-sort-value="0.98" | 980 m || 
|-id=895 bgcolor=#E9E9E9
| 426895 ||  || — || March 18, 2010 || WISE || WISE || — || align=right | 2.1 km || 
|-id=896 bgcolor=#E9E9E9
| 426896 ||  || — || January 22, 2006 || Mount Lemmon || Mount Lemmon Survey || — || align=right | 1.6 km || 
|-id=897 bgcolor=#E9E9E9
| 426897 ||  || — || January 6, 2010 || Catalina || CSS || — || align=right | 2.5 km || 
|-id=898 bgcolor=#d6d6d6
| 426898 ||  || — || May 30, 2010 || WISE || WISE || — || align=right | 2.6 km || 
|-id=899 bgcolor=#d6d6d6
| 426899 ||  || — || November 2, 2007 || Catalina || CSS || — || align=right | 3.7 km || 
|-id=900 bgcolor=#E9E9E9
| 426900 ||  || — || December 26, 2005 || Mount Lemmon || Mount Lemmon Survey || — || align=right | 2.1 km || 
|}

426901–427000 

|-bgcolor=#d6d6d6
| 426901 ||  || — || March 10, 2005 || Kitt Peak || Spacewatch || — || align=right | 3.0 km || 
|-id=902 bgcolor=#d6d6d6
| 426902 ||  || — || September 12, 2007 || Catalina || CSS || — || align=right | 3.5 km || 
|-id=903 bgcolor=#E9E9E9
| 426903 ||  || — || September 20, 2009 || Kitt Peak || Spacewatch || — || align=right | 1.1 km || 
|-id=904 bgcolor=#d6d6d6
| 426904 ||  || — || January 20, 2009 || Kitt Peak || Spacewatch || — || align=right | 2.4 km || 
|-id=905 bgcolor=#d6d6d6
| 426905 ||  || — || December 1, 1996 || Kitt Peak || Spacewatch || — || align=right | 3.3 km || 
|-id=906 bgcolor=#d6d6d6
| 426906 ||  || — || February 13, 2010 || Mount Lemmon || Mount Lemmon Survey || — || align=right | 2.6 km || 
|-id=907 bgcolor=#d6d6d6
| 426907 ||  || — || October 9, 2002 || Kitt Peak || Spacewatch || — || align=right | 2.1 km || 
|-id=908 bgcolor=#d6d6d6
| 426908 ||  || — || September 2, 2008 || Kitt Peak || Spacewatch || EOS || align=right | 2.5 km || 
|-id=909 bgcolor=#fefefe
| 426909 ||  || — || March 31, 2005 || Anderson Mesa || LONEOS || — || align=right | 1.0 km || 
|-id=910 bgcolor=#d6d6d6
| 426910 ||  || — || January 2, 2009 || Kitt Peak || Spacewatch || — || align=right | 2.4 km || 
|-id=911 bgcolor=#fefefe
| 426911 ||  || — || October 20, 2006 || Mount Lemmon || Mount Lemmon Survey || (2076) || align=right | 1.0 km || 
|-id=912 bgcolor=#d6d6d6
| 426912 ||  || — || November 19, 2008 || Kitt Peak || Spacewatch || TEL || align=right | 1.5 km || 
|-id=913 bgcolor=#d6d6d6
| 426913 ||  || — || April 30, 2006 || Kitt Peak || Spacewatch || — || align=right | 2.8 km || 
|-id=914 bgcolor=#d6d6d6
| 426914 ||  || — || May 3, 2005 || Kitt Peak || Spacewatch || — || align=right | 4.3 km || 
|-id=915 bgcolor=#d6d6d6
| 426915 ||  || — || December 1, 2008 || Mount Lemmon || Mount Lemmon Survey || EOS || align=right | 2.0 km || 
|-id=916 bgcolor=#d6d6d6
| 426916 ||  || — || May 2, 2006 || Mount Lemmon || Mount Lemmon Survey || KOR || align=right | 1.4 km || 
|-id=917 bgcolor=#d6d6d6
| 426917 ||  || — || October 12, 2007 || Mount Lemmon || Mount Lemmon Survey || — || align=right | 3.0 km || 
|-id=918 bgcolor=#fefefe
| 426918 ||  || — || March 24, 2006 || Kitt Peak || Spacewatch || — || align=right data-sort-value="0.77" | 770 m || 
|-id=919 bgcolor=#d6d6d6
| 426919 ||  || — || December 5, 2002 || Socorro || LINEAR || — || align=right | 3.2 km || 
|-id=920 bgcolor=#E9E9E9
| 426920 ||  || — || December 13, 2004 || Kitt Peak || Spacewatch || HOF || align=right | 2.7 km || 
|-id=921 bgcolor=#d6d6d6
| 426921 ||  || — || September 11, 2007 || Mount Lemmon || Mount Lemmon Survey || — || align=right | 2.9 km || 
|-id=922 bgcolor=#E9E9E9
| 426922 ||  || — || September 29, 2008 || Kitt Peak || Spacewatch || — || align=right | 2.5 km || 
|-id=923 bgcolor=#E9E9E9
| 426923 ||  || — || November 9, 2009 || Kitt Peak || Spacewatch || — || align=right | 1.5 km || 
|-id=924 bgcolor=#E9E9E9
| 426924 ||  || — || December 1, 2005 || Mount Lemmon || Mount Lemmon Survey || — || align=right | 1.9 km || 
|-id=925 bgcolor=#d6d6d6
| 426925 ||  || — || September 25, 2007 || Mount Lemmon || Mount Lemmon Survey || — || align=right | 3.9 km || 
|-id=926 bgcolor=#E9E9E9
| 426926 ||  || — || December 5, 2005 || Kitt Peak || Spacewatch || — || align=right | 1.5 km || 
|-id=927 bgcolor=#d6d6d6
| 426927 ||  || — || November 27, 2009 || Mount Lemmon || Mount Lemmon Survey || — || align=right | 4.0 km || 
|-id=928 bgcolor=#E9E9E9
| 426928 ||  || — || April 25, 2010 || WISE || WISE || — || align=right | 2.6 km || 
|-id=929 bgcolor=#d6d6d6
| 426929 ||  || — || April 1, 2005 || Kitt Peak || Spacewatch || — || align=right | 2.9 km || 
|-id=930 bgcolor=#E9E9E9
| 426930 ||  || — || February 2, 2006 || Kitt Peak || Spacewatch || WIT || align=right | 1.1 km || 
|-id=931 bgcolor=#d6d6d6
| 426931 ||  || — || December 5, 2002 || Kitt Peak || Spacewatch || — || align=right | 4.5 km || 
|-id=932 bgcolor=#d6d6d6
| 426932 ||  || — || November 4, 2002 || Kitt Peak || Spacewatch || — || align=right | 3.2 km || 
|-id=933 bgcolor=#E9E9E9
| 426933 ||  || — || September 23, 2008 || Mount Lemmon || Mount Lemmon Survey || MRX || align=right | 1.1 km || 
|-id=934 bgcolor=#d6d6d6
| 426934 ||  || — || October 8, 2007 || Catalina || CSS || EOS || align=right | 2.1 km || 
|-id=935 bgcolor=#E9E9E9
| 426935 ||  || — || March 25, 2007 || Mount Lemmon || Mount Lemmon Survey || ADE || align=right | 3.2 km || 
|-id=936 bgcolor=#E9E9E9
| 426936 ||  || — || December 6, 2005 || Kitt Peak || Spacewatch || — || align=right | 1.2 km || 
|-id=937 bgcolor=#E9E9E9
| 426937 ||  || — || June 5, 1999 || Kitt Peak || Spacewatch || — || align=right | 1.5 km || 
|-id=938 bgcolor=#d6d6d6
| 426938 ||  || — || March 6, 2003 || Anderson Mesa || LONEOS || Tj (2.98) || align=right | 4.5 km || 
|-id=939 bgcolor=#d6d6d6
| 426939 ||  || — || March 17, 2005 || Campo Imperatore || CINEOS || — || align=right | 4.0 km || 
|-id=940 bgcolor=#d6d6d6
| 426940 ||  || — || December 31, 2008 || Mount Lemmon || Mount Lemmon Survey || — || align=right | 4.5 km || 
|-id=941 bgcolor=#E9E9E9
| 426941 ||  || — || November 24, 2003 || Kitt Peak || Spacewatch || AGN || align=right | 1.5 km || 
|-id=942 bgcolor=#d6d6d6
| 426942 ||  || — || March 16, 2004 || Siding Spring || SSS || — || align=right | 3.7 km || 
|-id=943 bgcolor=#d6d6d6
| 426943 ||  || — || June 5, 2005 || Kitt Peak || Spacewatch || — || align=right | 4.1 km || 
|-id=944 bgcolor=#d6d6d6
| 426944 ||  || — || February 4, 2009 || Mount Lemmon || Mount Lemmon Survey || — || align=right | 3.2 km || 
|-id=945 bgcolor=#E9E9E9
| 426945 ||  || — || March 11, 2007 || Kitt Peak || Spacewatch || — || align=right | 1.2 km || 
|-id=946 bgcolor=#E9E9E9
| 426946 ||  || — || October 3, 1999 || Socorro || LINEAR || — || align=right | 3.1 km || 
|-id=947 bgcolor=#E9E9E9
| 426947 ||  || — || February 25, 2011 || Kitt Peak || Spacewatch || — || align=right | 2.0 km || 
|-id=948 bgcolor=#d6d6d6
| 426948 ||  || — || December 7, 1996 || Kitt Peak || Spacewatch || VER || align=right | 2.6 km || 
|-id=949 bgcolor=#d6d6d6
| 426949 ||  || — || December 2, 2008 || Kitt Peak || Spacewatch || — || align=right | 2.9 km || 
|-id=950 bgcolor=#E9E9E9
| 426950 ||  || — || December 15, 2009 || Mount Lemmon || Mount Lemmon Survey || — || align=right | 2.1 km || 
|-id=951 bgcolor=#d6d6d6
| 426951 ||  || — || October 12, 2007 || Kitt Peak || Spacewatch || HYG || align=right | 3.5 km || 
|-id=952 bgcolor=#d6d6d6
| 426952 ||  || — || June 26, 2010 || WISE || WISE || — || align=right | 2.1 km || 
|-id=953 bgcolor=#d6d6d6
| 426953 ||  || — || September 14, 2007 || Mount Lemmon || Mount Lemmon Survey || — || align=right | 3.2 km || 
|-id=954 bgcolor=#d6d6d6
| 426954 ||  || — || October 17, 2007 || Mount Lemmon || Mount Lemmon Survey || — || align=right | 3.5 km || 
|-id=955 bgcolor=#d6d6d6
| 426955 ||  || — || October 30, 2007 || Kitt Peak || Spacewatch || — || align=right | 3.4 km || 
|-id=956 bgcolor=#E9E9E9
| 426956 ||  || — || October 6, 2008 || Mount Lemmon || Mount Lemmon Survey || — || align=right | 1.8 km || 
|-id=957 bgcolor=#d6d6d6
| 426957 ||  || — || November 23, 2008 || Kitt Peak || Spacewatch || — || align=right | 3.2 km || 
|-id=958 bgcolor=#d6d6d6
| 426958 ||  || — || November 8, 2007 || Mount Lemmon || Mount Lemmon Survey || ELF || align=right | 3.3 km || 
|-id=959 bgcolor=#d6d6d6
| 426959 ||  || — || March 10, 2005 || Catalina || CSS || — || align=right | 4.1 km || 
|-id=960 bgcolor=#E9E9E9
| 426960 ||  || — || September 26, 1995 || Kitt Peak || Spacewatch || — || align=right | 1.6 km || 
|-id=961 bgcolor=#d6d6d6
| 426961 ||  || — || August 29, 2006 || Kitt Peak || Spacewatch || — || align=right | 2.9 km || 
|-id=962 bgcolor=#d6d6d6
| 426962 ||  || — || September 16, 2012 || Kitt Peak || Spacewatch || — || align=right | 3.2 km || 
|-id=963 bgcolor=#d6d6d6
| 426963 ||  || — || December 29, 2008 || Kitt Peak || Spacewatch || — || align=right | 2.5 km || 
|-id=964 bgcolor=#d6d6d6
| 426964 ||  || — || September 15, 2006 || Kitt Peak || Spacewatch || — || align=right | 3.0 km || 
|-id=965 bgcolor=#d6d6d6
| 426965 ||  || — || December 2, 2008 || Mount Lemmon || Mount Lemmon Survey || — || align=right | 2.7 km || 
|-id=966 bgcolor=#E9E9E9
| 426966 ||  || — || August 22, 2004 || Siding Spring || SSS || — || align=right | 1.1 km || 
|-id=967 bgcolor=#d6d6d6
| 426967 ||  || — || January 2, 2009 || Kitt Peak || Spacewatch || — || align=right | 2.5 km || 
|-id=968 bgcolor=#fefefe
| 426968 ||  || — || September 26, 1998 || Socorro || LINEAR || NYS || align=right data-sort-value="0.86" | 860 m || 
|-id=969 bgcolor=#d6d6d6
| 426969 ||  || — || February 21, 2009 || Catalina || CSS || — || align=right | 4.1 km || 
|-id=970 bgcolor=#d6d6d6
| 426970 ||  || — || January 20, 2009 || Kitt Peak || Spacewatch || KOR || align=right | 1.6 km || 
|-id=971 bgcolor=#d6d6d6
| 426971 ||  || — || November 9, 2007 || Catalina || CSS || — || align=right | 3.0 km || 
|-id=972 bgcolor=#d6d6d6
| 426972 ||  || — || January 11, 2008 || Kitt Peak || Spacewatch || — || align=right | 3.0 km || 
|-id=973 bgcolor=#d6d6d6
| 426973 ||  || — || September 27, 2006 || Kitt Peak || Spacewatch || — || align=right | 2.4 km || 
|-id=974 bgcolor=#d6d6d6
| 426974 ||  || — || June 23, 2010 || WISE || WISE || NAE || align=right | 2.8 km || 
|-id=975 bgcolor=#d6d6d6
| 426975 ||  || — || October 8, 2007 || Mount Lemmon || Mount Lemmon Survey || EOS || align=right | 1.9 km || 
|-id=976 bgcolor=#d6d6d6
| 426976 ||  || — || June 27, 2005 || Kitt Peak || Spacewatch || — || align=right | 4.1 km || 
|-id=977 bgcolor=#d6d6d6
| 426977 ||  || — || April 12, 2004 || Kitt Peak || Spacewatch || THM || align=right | 2.2 km || 
|-id=978 bgcolor=#d6d6d6
| 426978 ||  || — || August 29, 2006 || Kitt Peak || Spacewatch || — || align=right | 2.8 km || 
|-id=979 bgcolor=#E9E9E9
| 426979 ||  || — || September 18, 2003 || Socorro || LINEAR || — || align=right | 3.1 km || 
|-id=980 bgcolor=#d6d6d6
| 426980 ||  || — || June 19, 2006 || Mount Lemmon || Mount Lemmon Survey || — || align=right | 3.0 km || 
|-id=981 bgcolor=#d6d6d6
| 426981 ||  || — || December 19, 2007 || Mount Lemmon || Mount Lemmon Survey || — || align=right | 4.9 km || 
|-id=982 bgcolor=#d6d6d6
| 426982 ||  || — || February 13, 2009 || Kitt Peak || Spacewatch || — || align=right | 3.6 km || 
|-id=983 bgcolor=#d6d6d6
| 426983 ||  || — || May 11, 2005 || Kitt Peak || Spacewatch || — || align=right | 3.1 km || 
|-id=984 bgcolor=#d6d6d6
| 426984 ||  || — || August 21, 2006 || Kitt Peak || Spacewatch || — || align=right | 2.7 km || 
|-id=985 bgcolor=#d6d6d6
| 426985 ||  || — || November 19, 2007 || Kitt Peak || Spacewatch || 7:4 || align=right | 3.8 km || 
|-id=986 bgcolor=#d6d6d6
| 426986 ||  || — || February 12, 2004 || Kitt Peak || Spacewatch || — || align=right | 3.1 km || 
|-id=987 bgcolor=#d6d6d6
| 426987 ||  || — || April 19, 2004 || Kitt Peak || Spacewatch || VER || align=right | 3.7 km || 
|-id=988 bgcolor=#d6d6d6
| 426988 ||  || — || December 31, 2008 || Mount Lemmon || Mount Lemmon Survey || TEL || align=right | 1.6 km || 
|-id=989 bgcolor=#E9E9E9
| 426989 ||  || — || November 26, 2003 || Kitt Peak || Spacewatch || — || align=right | 2.3 km || 
|-id=990 bgcolor=#d6d6d6
| 426990 ||  || — || April 11, 2010 || Mount Lemmon || Mount Lemmon Survey || EOS || align=right | 2.2 km || 
|-id=991 bgcolor=#d6d6d6
| 426991 ||  || — || February 20, 2009 || Kitt Peak || Spacewatch || — || align=right | 3.4 km || 
|-id=992 bgcolor=#C2FFFF
| 426992 ||  || — || April 24, 2003 || Kitt Peak || Spacewatch || L4 || align=right | 8.2 km || 
|-id=993 bgcolor=#C2FFFF
| 426993 ||  || — || March 9, 2002 || Kitt Peak || Spacewatch || L4 || align=right | 8.0 km || 
|-id=994 bgcolor=#d6d6d6
| 426994 ||  || — || March 8, 2009 || Mount Lemmon || Mount Lemmon Survey || EOS || align=right | 2.5 km || 
|-id=995 bgcolor=#fefefe
| 426995 ||  || — || December 31, 2007 || Mount Lemmon || Mount Lemmon Survey || NYS || align=right data-sort-value="0.65" | 650 m || 
|-id=996 bgcolor=#E9E9E9
| 426996 ||  || — || December 18, 2001 || Socorro || LINEAR || — || align=right | 2.4 km || 
|-id=997 bgcolor=#d6d6d6
| 426997 ||  || — || August 26, 2009 || Catalina || CSS || — || align=right | 2.1 km || 
|-id=998 bgcolor=#d6d6d6
| 426998 ||  || — || March 25, 2007 || Mount Lemmon || Mount Lemmon Survey || EOS || align=right | 2.2 km || 
|-id=999 bgcolor=#E9E9E9
| 426999 ||  || — || May 14, 2008 || Mount Lemmon || Mount Lemmon Survey || — || align=right | 2.3 km || 
|-id=000 bgcolor=#E9E9E9
| 427000 ||  || — || December 13, 2006 || Mount Lemmon || Mount Lemmon Survey || — || align=right | 1.1 km || 
|}

References

External links 
 Discovery Circumstances: Numbered Minor Planets (425001)–(430000) (IAU Minor Planet Center)

0426